= Tjetju =

Ancient Egyptian official

- Vizier of Egypt
- Tenure: c. 2300 BC
- Pharaoh: Pepi I
- Burial: Saqqara, Egypt

Tjetju (fl. c. 2300 BC) was an ancient Egyptian official at the end of the Old Kingdom or in the First Intermediate Period. He held a series of high titles making him one of the most influential people at the royal court. His most important title was that of vizier. He was also overseer of the treasuries, overseer of the six big houses, overseer of the two granaries and overseer of all royal work of the king.

Tjetu is known from his modest tomb at Saqqara, built close to the much bigger tomb complexes of Mereruka and Kagemni. Tjetju was a priest at the pyramid temple of king Pepi I. Therefore, he is often dated under the latter king. Others date him to the First Intermediate Period.

== Literature ==
- Strudwick, Nigel (1985). The Administration of Egypt in the Old Kingdom: The Highest Titles and Their Holders (PDF). Studies in Egyptology. London; Boston: Kegan Paul International. ISBN 978-0-7103-0107-9.
