= Rawer (vizier) =

Ancient Egyptian official

- Vizier of Egypt
- Tenure: c. 2290 BC
- Pharaoh: Pepi I
- Burial: Saqqara, Egypt

Rawer (fl. c. 2290 BC) was an ancient Egyptian official of the Sixth Dynasty of Egypt. His main title was that of a vizier, making him one of the highest officials at the royal court. Rawer is only known from his rather modest mastaba found at Saqqara, close to the Pyramid of Teti. Rawer had several titles, including overseer of Upper Egypt, but also royal sealer and beloved of god.

His mastaba is only 6.83 m long and 4.3 m wide. It contained one room, the offering chapel, with the entrance on the east side. On the west side of the offering chapel are two false doors. All walls are decorated with scenes showing offering bearers and Rawer. There are no family members shown in the chapel. No king's name appears in the tomb. On stylistic grounds, one might date the mastaba to the reign of Pepi I.

It appears that Rawer was part of a conspiracy that ultimately failed, and Rawer was subsequently condemned. His name was damaged and his image was subsequently erased from his mastaba tomb as part of damnatio memoriae.

== Literature ==
- el-Fikey, Said Amer (1980). The Tomb of the Vizier Re'wer. Egyptology Today 4. London; Warminster: Aris & Philipps. ISBN 0-85668-158-X.
- Strudwick, Nigel (1985). The Administration of Egypt in the Old Kingdom: The Highest Titles and Their Holders (PDF). Studies in Egyptology. London; Boston: Kegan Paul International. ISBN 978-0-7103-0107-9. Archived from the original (PDF) on 2014-04-03.
- Kanawati, Naguib (2003). Conspiracies in the Egyptian Palace: Unis to Pepy I (Preview only) (PDF). New York: Routledge. ISBN 0-415-27107-X. Archived
