= Kay (vizier) =

Ancient Egyptian official

- Vizier of Egypt
- Tenure: c. 2450 BC
- Burial: Saqqara, Egypt

Kay (fl. c. 2450 BC) was an Ancient Egyptian official living most likely in the Fifth Dynasty. He is mainly known for his mastaba in Saqqara North. Kay held a high number of important titles making him the most powerful person of his time, only second to the king. His main office was that of a vizier. Besides being vizier, he also held many other important titles, such as Overseer of the treasuries, Overseer of Upper Egypt, overseer of the scribes of the king's document, overseer of the six big houses and overseer of all royal works of the king. His mastaba in Saqqara was recorded by Gaston Maspero who assigned to it the number D 19. Kay bore 51 titles, making him the vizier with the highest number of titles. Kay was the first Egyptian official with the title of overseer of the six big houses. The office became one of the most important at the royal court in the later Fifth Dynasty and continued to be so during the subsequent Sixth Dynasty. The dating of Kay is uncertain. No biography is preserved in his tomb, and no king's name is mentioned. A date in the middle of the Fifth Dynasty has been proposed. Others prefer a date in the early Fifth Dynasty.

== Literature ==
- Bárta, Miroslav (2013). "Kings, Viziers and Courtiers: Executive Power in the Third Millennium B.C.". In Morena García, Juan Carlos (ed.). Ancient Egyptian Administration. Brill. pp. 154–175. ISBN 978-90-04-24952-3.
- Mariette, Auguste; Maspero, Gaston (1889). Les mastabas de l'Ancien Empire: Fragment du dernier ouvrage de A. Mariette, publié d'après le manuscrit de l'auteur. Paris. OCLC 46226552.
- Strudwick, Nigel (1985). The Administration of Egypt in the Old Kingdom: The Highest Titles and Their Holders (PDF). Studies in Egyptology. London; Boston: Kegan Paul International. ISBN 978-0-7103-0107-9. Archived from the original (PDF) on 2014-04-03.
