= Seshemnefer III =

Ancient Egyptian vizier

Seshemnefer sṠm-nfr
- Vizier of Egypt
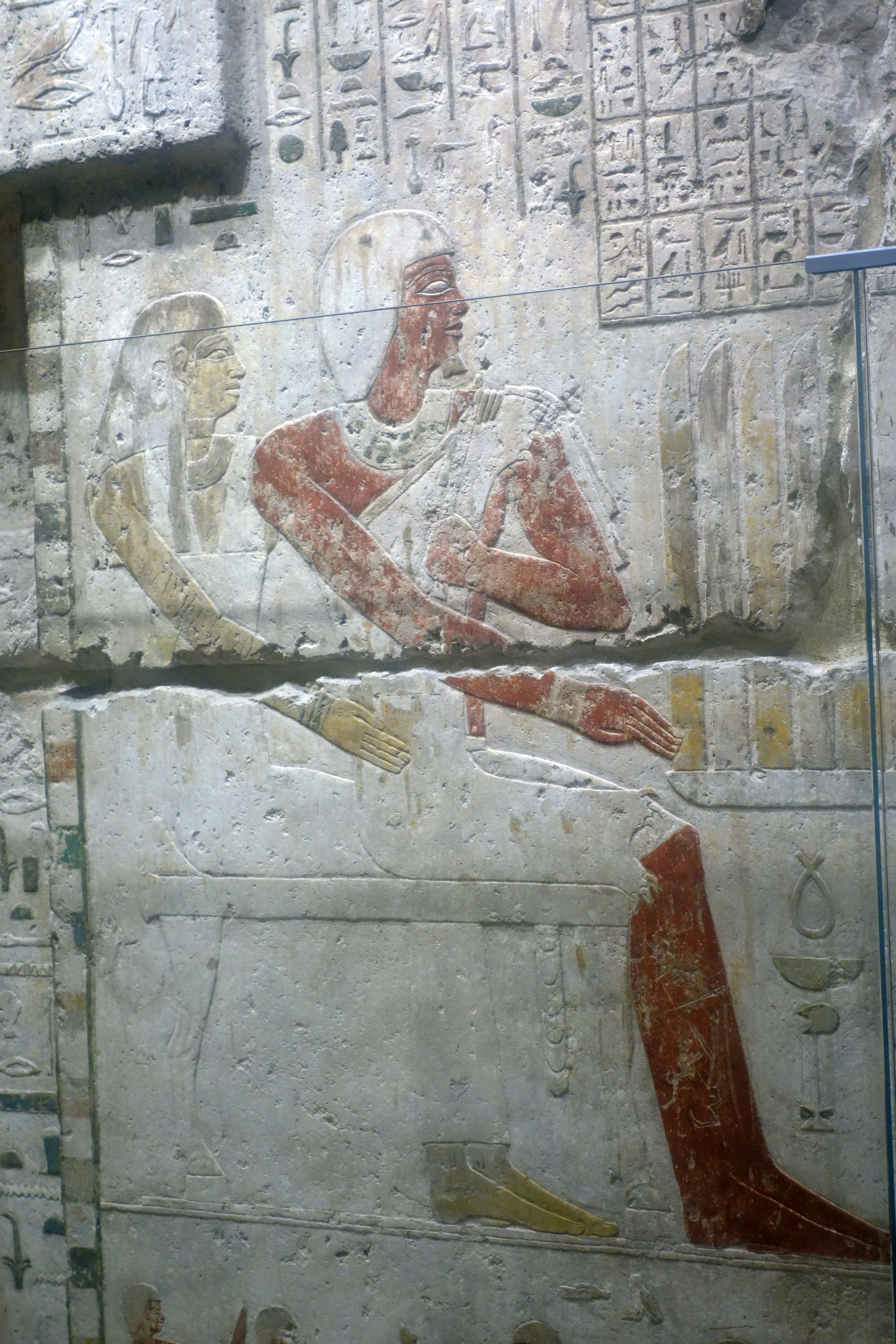
Seshemnefer and his wife
s T33 nfr sr
"good leader"
- Tenure: c. 2450 BC
- Dynasty: Fifth Dynasty of Egypt
- Pharaoh: Nyuserre Ini
- Burial: Giza, Giza Governorate, Egypt
Spouse
Heteperes
Htp t p Hr r s
- Father: Seshemnefer II
- Mother: Meritites
- Children: Seshemnefer; Seshemnefer; Seshemnefer; Neferseshemptah

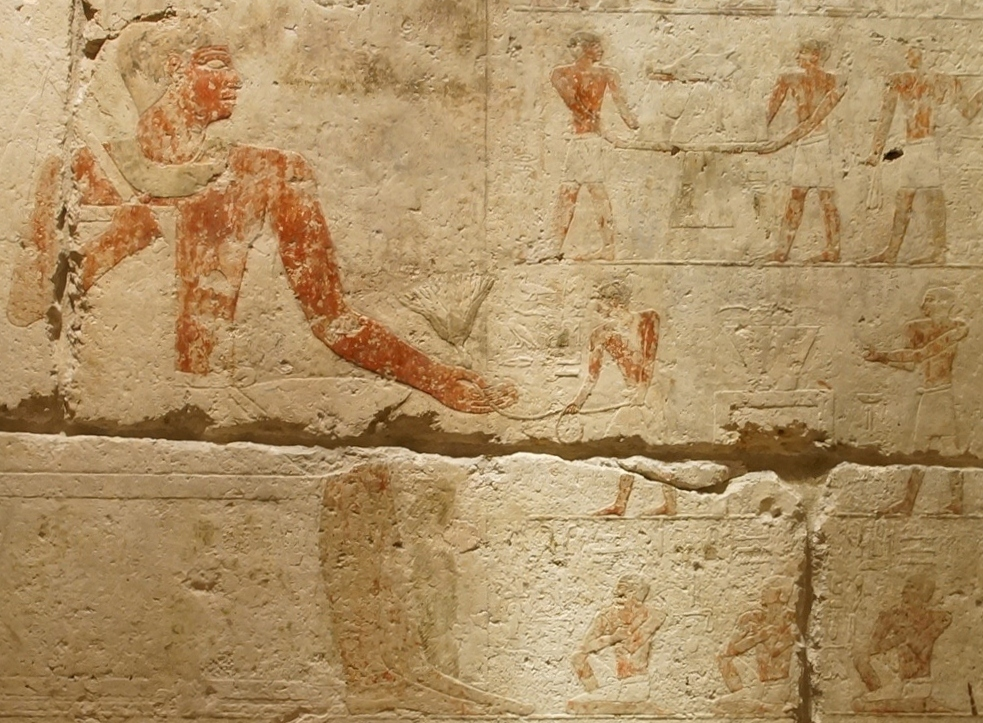
Burial Chamber of Seshemnofer III in the museum of the University of Tübingen (Germany) in the castle of Tübingen

Seshemnefer III "Ṡshm-nfr" (fl. c. 2450 BC) was vizier, during the era of King Nyuserre Ini, ruler of the 5th dynasty. He was the third generation in the family line and had his own tomb, G 5170 on the west side of Khufu's pyramid. Information about his life and family has been drawn from the decoration in his tomb and the documented history of his ancestors too.

== Genesis ==
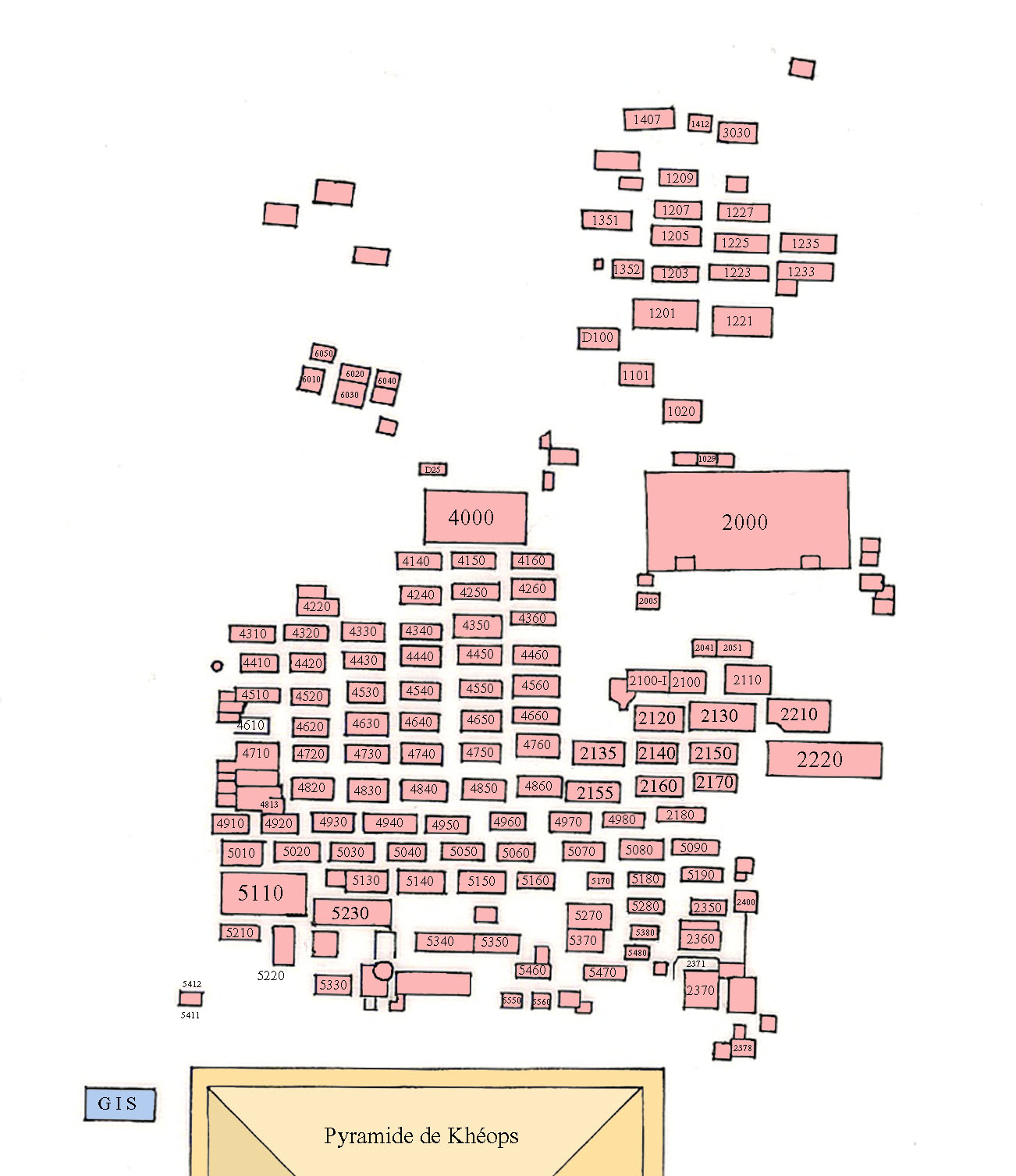
Map of the Western Cemetery at Giza

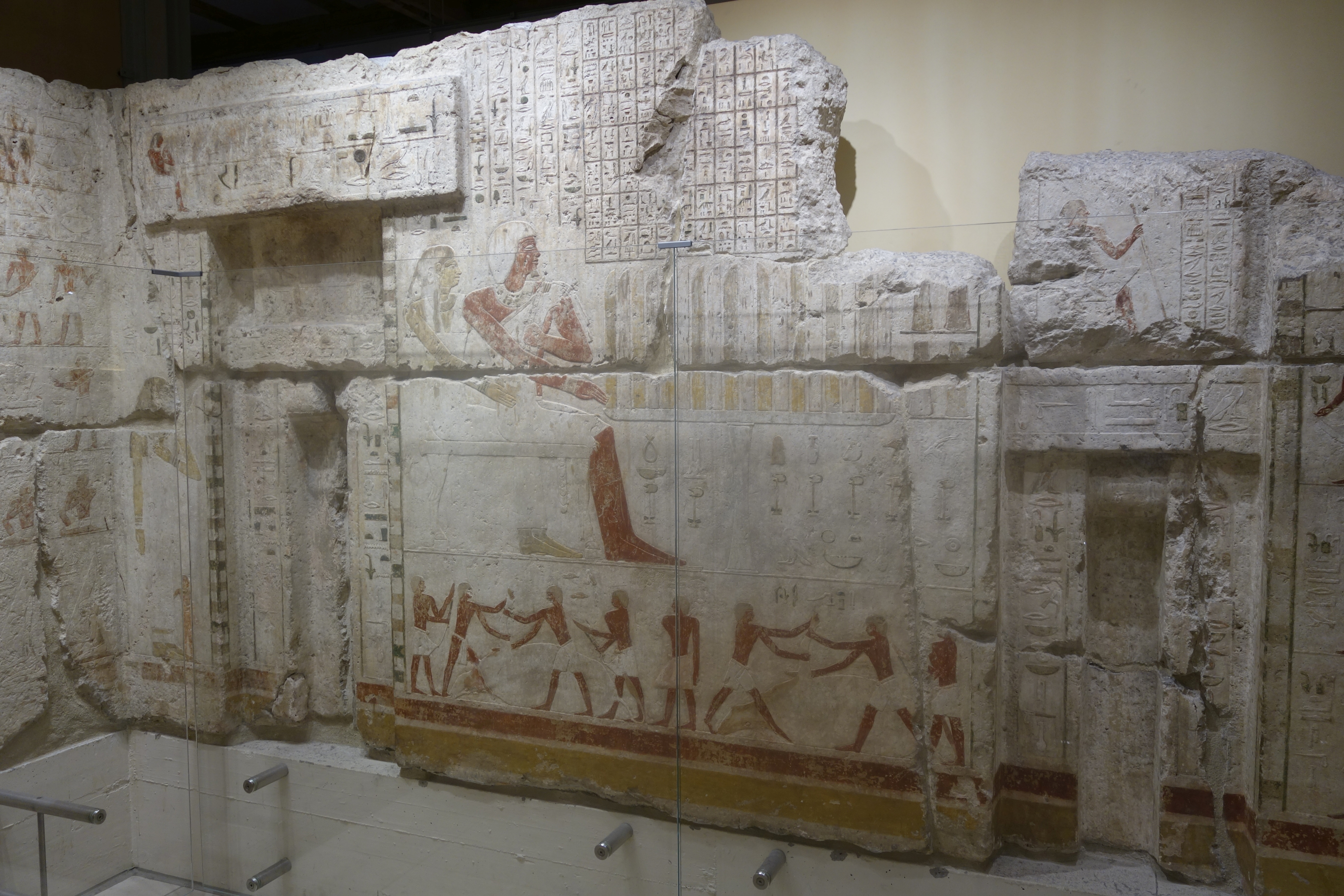
Landesuniversität Tübingen Museum exposition

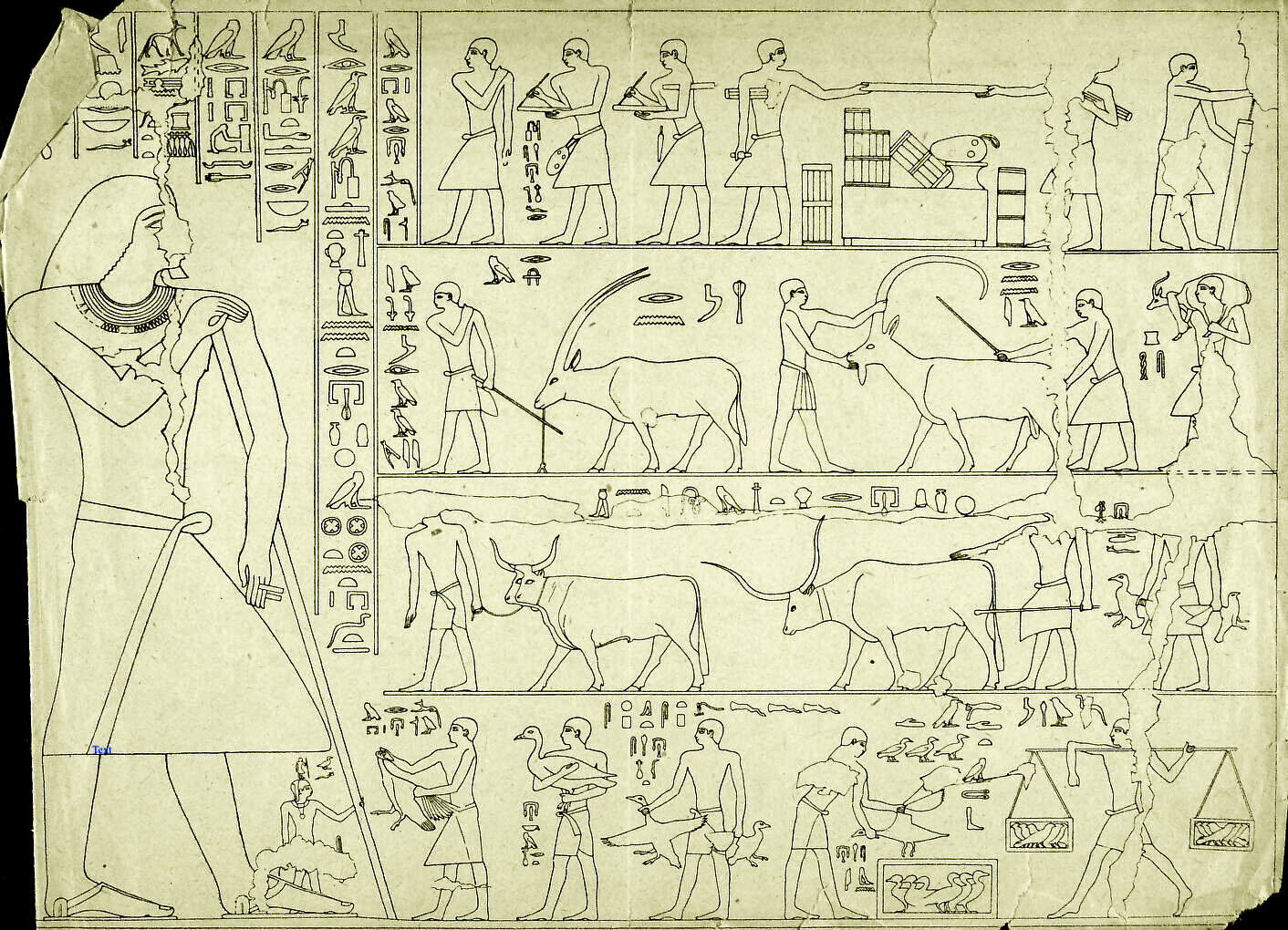
Chapel G 5170 east wall

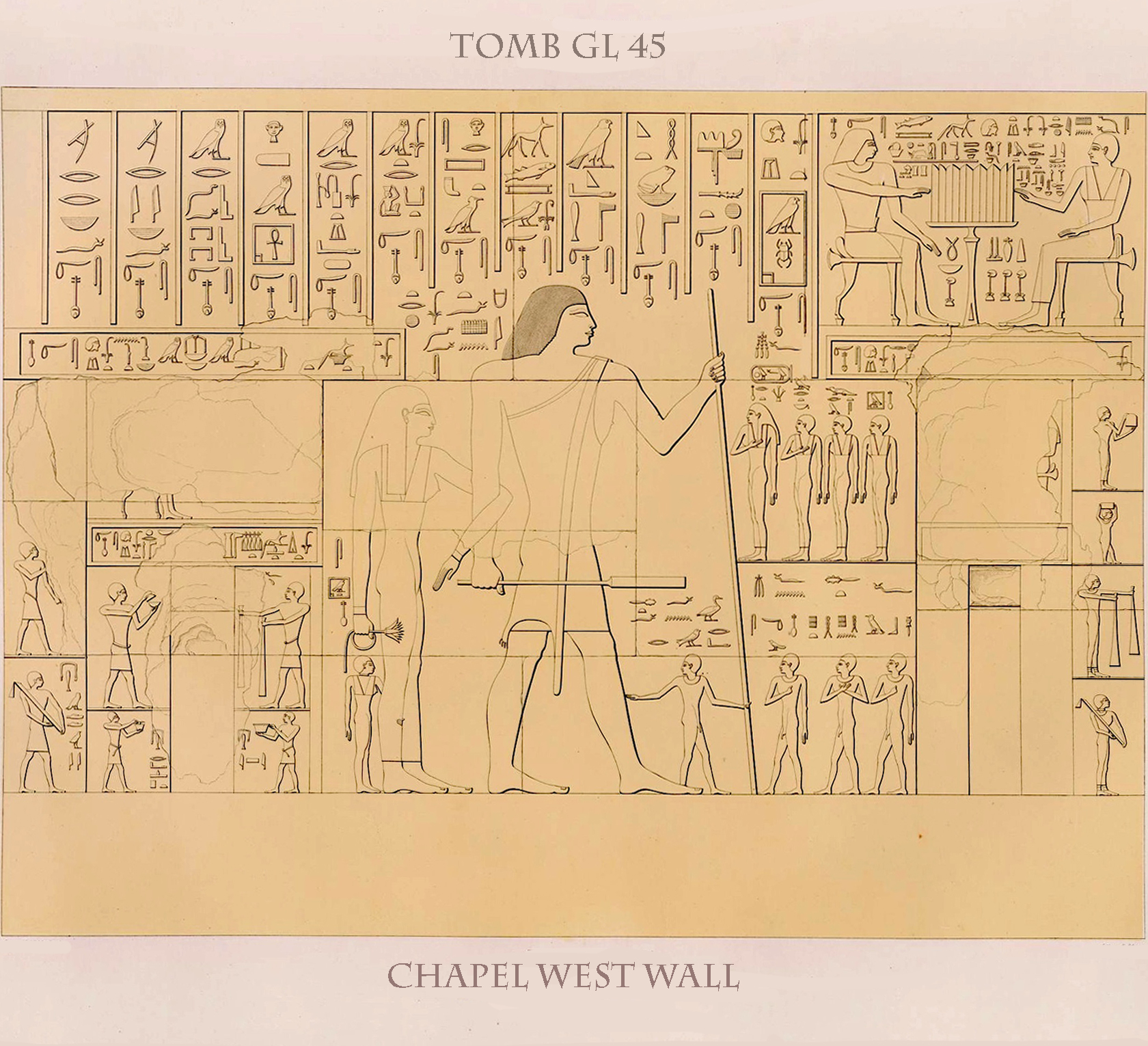
Tomb G 4940, west wall of the chamber; Seshemnefer III, his wife Imendjefes, their children and servants

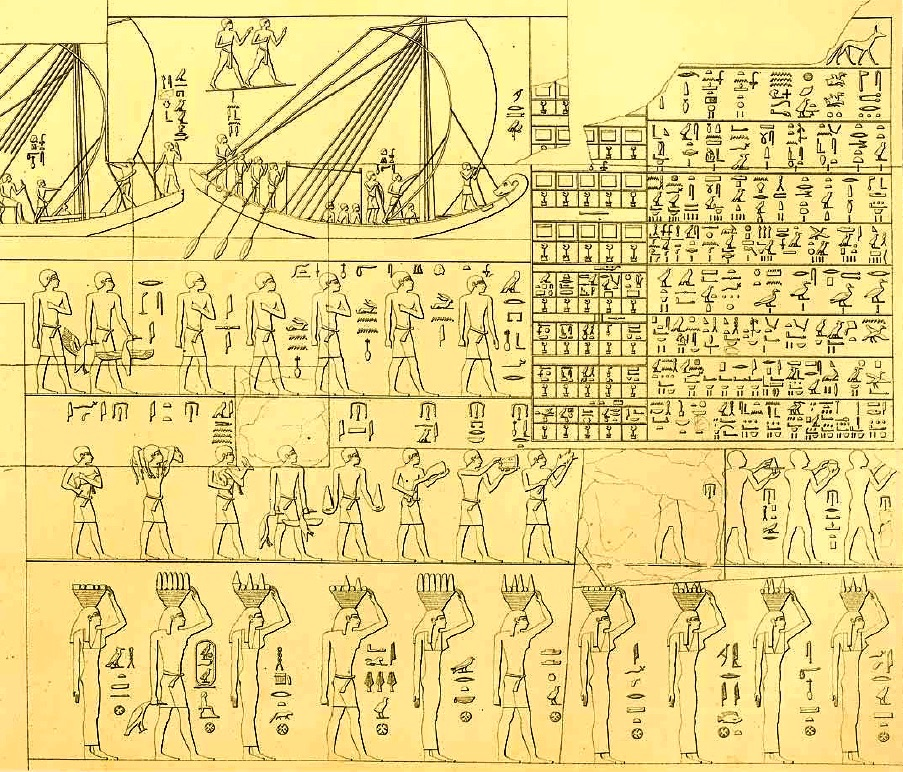
Tomb G 4940 east wall; two barges transport supplies for the journey to the afterlife, servants bring food to the storage room with counting records

On the west side of the Khufu's pyramid lies the necropolis of the 4th–5th dynasty, extending into the 6th dynasty. The oldest tombs, dating back to the reign of Khufu, are arranged in orderly rows behind the dominant tomb G 4000 of the prince and architect Hemiunu, while others date back to the later periods of the 5th dynasty, including the tomb of Seshemnefer III G 5170. The tomb was discovered in 1910 by the archaeologist Ernst von Sieglin (Note: Ernst Wilhelm von Sieglin (1848–1927) was a Stuttgart entrepreneur, antiques lover and cultural patron) who had the decorations removed from the chapel and transported to Berlin, where they were later donated to the Landesuniversität Tübingen and in 1938, were examined and described in detail by Junker.
Seshemnefer's wife, Hetepheres, was priestess of Neith, but also king's daughter of his body. He had four sons, three of whom were also called Seshemnefer; the fourth was called Neferseshemptah. One of these sons, Seshemnefer (IV), was buried at Dahshur and had mastaba there.

== Mastaba ==
The tomb is located in the western necropolis roughly on the edge of the aforementioned row behind G 4000 of the vizier Hemiunu in a group of mastabas dated to the late 5th dynasty. The original dimensions of the building were disturbed by later reconstructions, firstly by the addition of the southern side of the cult serdab in the part connected to the mastaba of Rawer I, Seshemnefer's son. From the spacious columned portico (5.8 × 2.8 m) there was an entrance to the sacrificial chamber in the shape of the letter "L" (3.64 × 1.43 m) with two false doors on the west, as well as a large serdab on the south side. The southern burial chamber is located in a shaft, where there is also a massive sarcophagus. The northern shaft was completed to a depth of 3.2 m and the sarcophagus was built directly into the rock in the chamber.

== Chapel ==
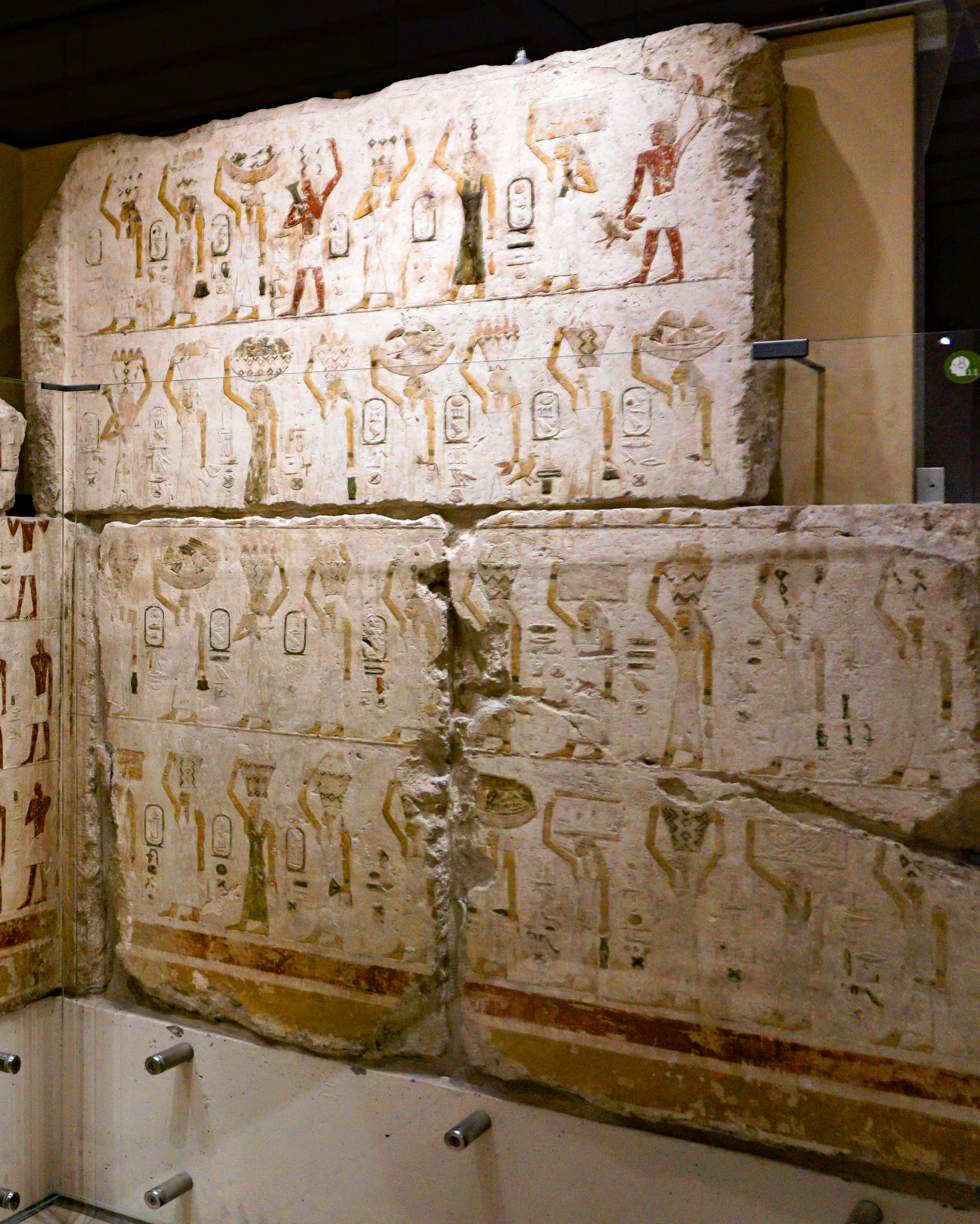
From the chapel, a group of maidservants bring gifts from the estates of noble kings.

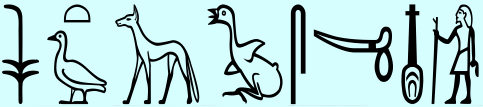
The preserved decoration of the chapel talks about the life of Seshemnefer and his family and the preparation for the departure to the underworld with full material security, members of his family, his servants. Numerous inscriptions list his numerous functions in the royal administration. Some functions express his active powers as a vizier, others numerous and often recurring, are rather symbolic of his social status. These are, Chief justice and vizier, Overseer of scribes of the king's documents, Overseer of all works of the king, Privy to the secret of all decrees of the king, Overseer of the two houses of weapons.
On the west wall of the chapel and through two false doors through which his soul leaves for the afterlife, he sits with his wife Heteperes at a sacrificial table, where all the food offerings are also named, below is a depiction of the slaughter of sacrificial bulls. On the north wall, a group of maidservants bring gifts from noble kings distinguishable cartouches in the upper register – King Khufu, Sahure, Userkaf, in the second register Neferirkare Kakai and Nyuserre Ini, and in the third register Khafra and Snofru again. The south wall depicts him seated, supervising the preparations for the ceremony, at his feet are his three sons with the scribe's sign, the third on the right Nfrsshmptah. His mind is entertained by a dancers group, accompanied by music on harps. A similar scene is on the east wall, above, scribes recording supplies under the supervision of Seshemnefer, who leans on the staff of the magnate. Tomb G 5170 of the vizier and royal scribe a representative of the elite during the 5th Dynasty, approximately dated to the reign of King Nyuserre Ini, (Note: 2402–2374 BC) whose interior decoration has been preserved, provides data that fits into the overall picture of the character and historical development of government structures.

== Seshemnefer family ==
The development of social and administrative structures, inextricably linked to the development of the economy and with deeply rooted religious rituals, in the 4th dynasty reached the stage of forming family and power relations outside the circle of exclusively members of the monarch's family. The development of social structures in the 4th dynasty, which was completed during the implementation of complex construction and logistical projects on the Giza plateau, was based on the central power of the king and his closest officials in the established administrative system. In the later period of the 5th dynasty, the monarch asserted his power by applying marriage unions of his descendants with non-royal officials of a central administration. The importance of several dignitaries and their families was than strengthened through marriages with royal daughters, most likely in the middle of the 5th dynasty. The social and political position of these men was strengthened, they became privileged. Each such union can be considered as evidence of the connection between the king and the dignitary and a reflection of the gradual transformation of the distribution of power. This was a new type of social relationship, not documented before the 5th Dynasty. The changes that took place in the middle of the 5th Dynasty also affected the country's administrative system. Kinship with the king was also a decisive factor in inheriting offices, positions, and professions, so-called nepotism.

=== Seshemnefer I ===
The first relevant tomb of the family is G 4940 in the western burial ground, located in the first group behind tomb G 4000 described in more detail by Reisner. (Note: The tomb was discovered by Lepsius) The chapel was decorated with figurative reliefs depicting Seshemnefer and his family, servants in the traditional ritual of preparing for the afterlife. On the west wall, in the upper register, are his numerous titles, and in the niche by the sacrificial table with his wife Imendjefes, there are again inscriptions of owner’s titles.

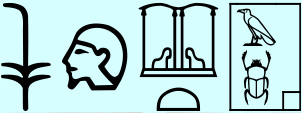
In the central relief, Seshemnefer is dressed in the garb of a nobleman, with his four daughters in front of him and his sons in the lower register, and his son Rawer (I) holding the ruler's staff at his left foot. Overall, it is a picture of a certain canon of tomb decoration in late 4th dynasty tombs, similar to those found in the Mastaba of Kaninisut or also in tomb Merib G 2100-I and Kagemni, all dated to the same period late 4th dynasty up to en early 6th dynasty, approximately. According to inscriptions on the western wall of the cult chapel Seshemnefer boasted a number of titles, only two of which are preceded by the king’s symbol, namely Superintendent of Royal Buildings, the second one Royal chamberlain of the mansion of Djedefre which includes king's serekh identified in the Mortuary temple of Djedefre at Abu Rawash So Seshemnefer I could be a server as a priest and a temple administrator here. (Note: The valley temple is located about 1.5 km northeast of the pyramid complex and is connected to it by a road. On the east side of the pyramid lies a mortuary temple and south of it a ship pit. The remains of several statues of the king have been found here.)

==== Seshemnefer II ====
He had a similar high social standing as his father. The tomb G 5080 is situated in the second row of the west cemetery behind G 2000. The most prominent titles of Seshemnefer II were recorded in the centre of west wall, mainly Overseer of the scribes of the king's documents, Scribe of the document-case of the king and Privy to the secret of the document-case of the king, Decoration of his chamber are described in detail by Kanawati.

Seshemnefer family
data	I.	II.	III.	[ref]
FATHER	HASH	Seshemnefer I	Seshemnefer II	
MOTHER	HASH	mwt t f sw t r x U7 r t t f Meritites (Note: Possibly 2nd wife of Seshemnefer I)	H nw w t s n Hanutsen	
WIFE	sw t r x i mn n D f Imendjefes,	H nw w t s n Hanutsen	Heteperes	
CHILDREN	Sons: Sešemnofernedjes, Pehenptah (Note: Later mastaba G 5280); Aba, Rawer (I), (Note: Later mastaba G 5270) Chufuanch, Seshemnofer IV, Noferseshemptah, Ranehotep, Rawer (II) (Note: Later mastaba G 5470); Pehenptah, Sachu, daughters: Neferthakhufu, Weretka, Sobekrementes, Neferhathor	Seshemnofernedjes (later Seshemnefer II), Seshemnofer child, Pehenptah, Aba, Rawer und Chufuanch	Three sons of the same father’s name Seshemnofer and Noferseshemptah	
TITLES (Note: The most prominent)	[Royal chamberlain of the mansion of Djedefre, Prophet of Heqet, Judge and boundary official Overseer of the king's works Overseer of the scribes of the document-case of the king	Overseer of the scribes of the king's documents, Overseer of all works of the king, Privy to the secret of all decrees of the king	King's son of his body, Count; Chief justice and vizier, Overseer of scribes of the king's documents, Overseer of all works of the king, Overseer of the two houses of weapons	
mastaba	Giza G 4940	Giza G 5080	G 5170	
REIGN	Shepseskaf –Neferirkare Kakai	~ Niuserre	Niuserre - Djedkare Isesi	

== Gallery ==
Symbolic barges in other mastabas with striking similarity and iconographic depiction, all dating at the end 4.th dynasty

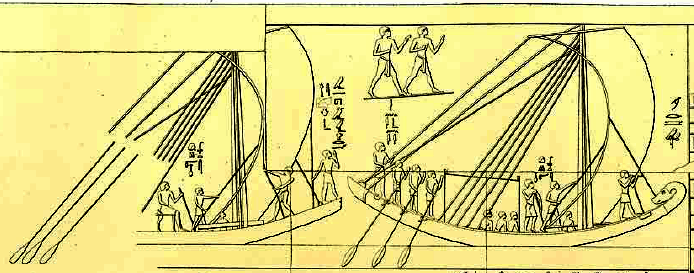
Tomb GL 45 east wall, Barges with crew tomb in the chapel of Seshemnefer I

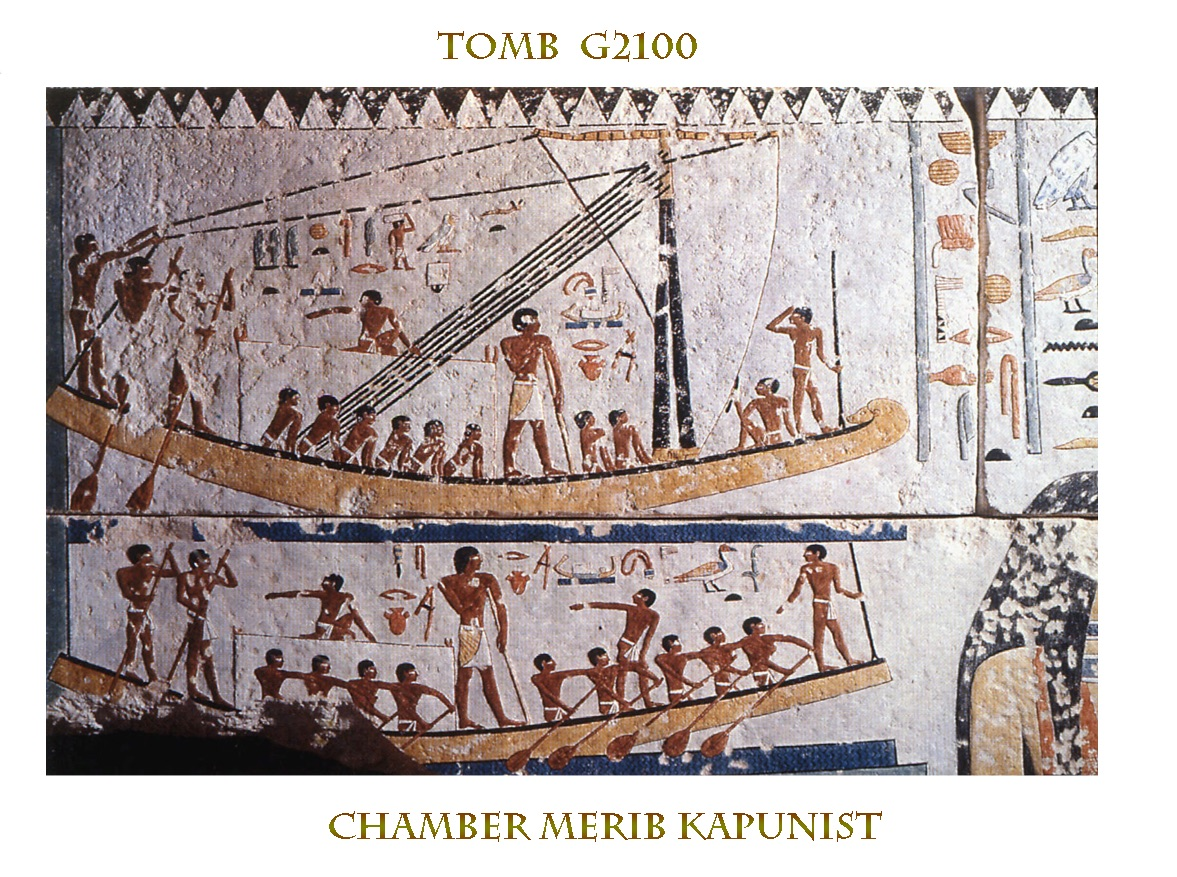
Relief of barges in the chapel G 2100-I

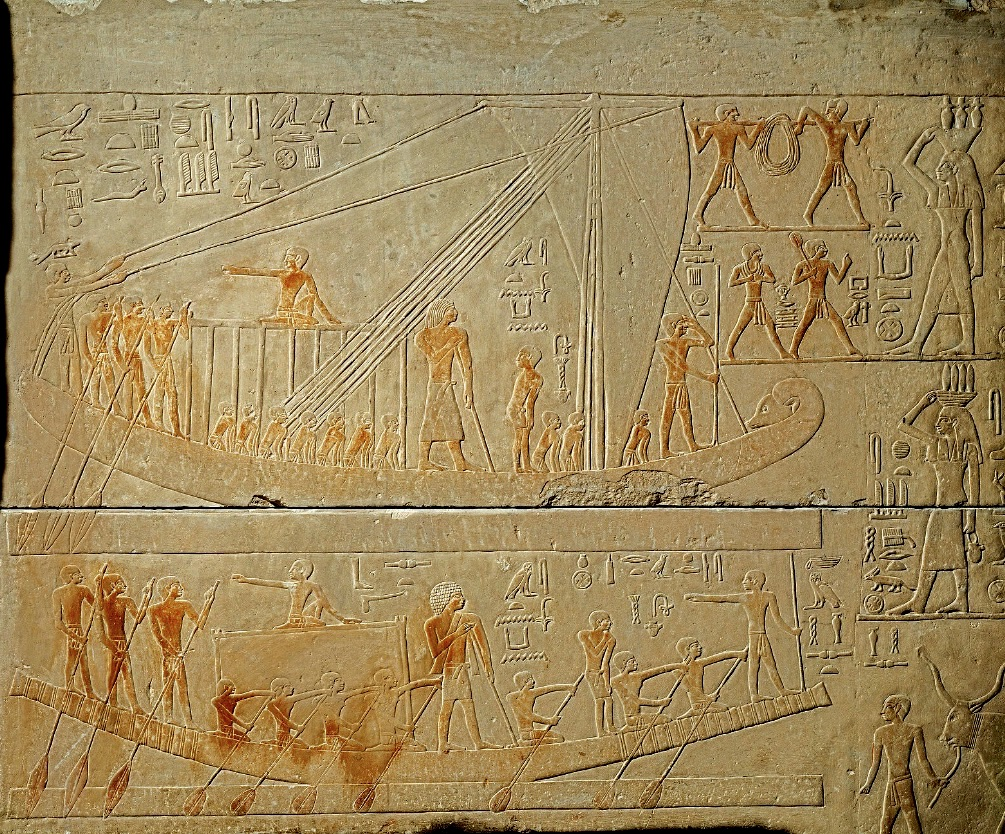
Mastaba of Kaninisut, two trading barges with rowers

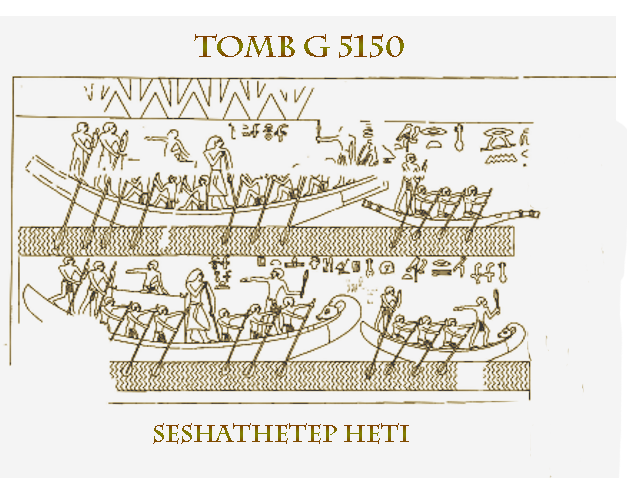
Barges above en entrance of the chapel G 5150
