= Akhethetep Hemi =

Ancient Egyptian official

- Vizier of Egypt
- Tenure: c. 2360 BC
- Burial: Saqqara, Egypt

Akhethetep Hemi (fl. c. 2360 BC) was an ancient Egyptian official at the end of the Fifth Dynasty, most likely in office under king Unas. His highest title was that of a vizier, making him the most important official at the royal court, only second to the king. Next to the vizier's titles he was also overseer of the treasuries, overseer of the scribes of the king's document and overseer of the double granary; all these were important positions at the royal court.

Akhethetep Hemi is mainly known from his mastaba not far from the Pyramid of Unas, that was excavated and published by Selim Hassan. The mastaba was later usurped by an official called Nebkauher. It often remains difficult to decide which titles in the tomb decoration belong to one or the other official.

== Literature ==
- Hassan, Selim (1975). The Mastaba of Neb-Kaw-Ḥer, Excavations at Saqqara 1937–1938, volume I. Cairo.
- Strudwick, Nigel (1985). The Administration of Egypt in the Old Kingdom: The Highest Titles and Their Holders (PDF). Studies in Egyptology. London; Boston: Kegan Paul International. ISBN 978-0-7103-0107-9. Archived from the original (PDF) on 2014-04-03.
