= IHY (disambiguation) =

IHY or Ihy may refer to:

- International Heliophysical Year, a UN sponsored to understand the sun
- Ihy, a young god in Egypt
- Ihy (vizier), ancient Egyptian official
