= Ankhwennefer =

Ankhwennefer may refer to:

- Ankhwennefer (pharaoh)
- Ankhwennefer (vizier)
