= Nefersheshemre =

Ancient Egyptian vizier

- Vizier of Egypt
- Tenure: c. 2345 BC
- Pharaoh: Teti
- Burial: Saqqara, Egypt
- Spouse: Semdet
- Children: Hekaib and 1 other son

Neferseshemre, also called Seshi (fl. c. 2345 BC) was a vizier from the early or middle part of the reign of King Teti of the Sixth Dynasty of Egypt.

== Biography ==
Neferseshemre's early career started off in the royal palace. He was overseer of the kings repast, overseer of the two chambers of the king, overseer of the two cool rooms of the palace, overseer of the residence and superintendent of priests and guards of Teti's pyramid. As vizier, Neferseshemre also held the positions of overseer of the scribes of the king's documents, overseer of all the works of the king, and overseer of the six great courts.

Neferseshemre and his wife Semdet had several children and one of them was named Hekaib. At least two of the sons of the vizier had their images and names erased from Neferseshemre's tomb.

== Tomb ==
Neferseshemre was buried in a mastaba in the Teti cemetery in Saqqara. The tomb is one of the earliest in the cemetery and lies immediately to the north of Teti's pyramid and to the west of those of the queens. The mastaba lies next to that of another vizier named Ankhmahor.

The mastaba was constructed of large blocks of limestone. Part of the mastaba consists of a chapel with a pillared hall which leads to a staircase which gives access to the roof. The burial chamber, which was located at the bottom of a shaft, was not decorated, which was unusual. The tomb appears to be unfinished at the time Neferseshemre died.
