= Nasekheperensekhmet =

Ancient Egyptian vizier

- Vizier of the North
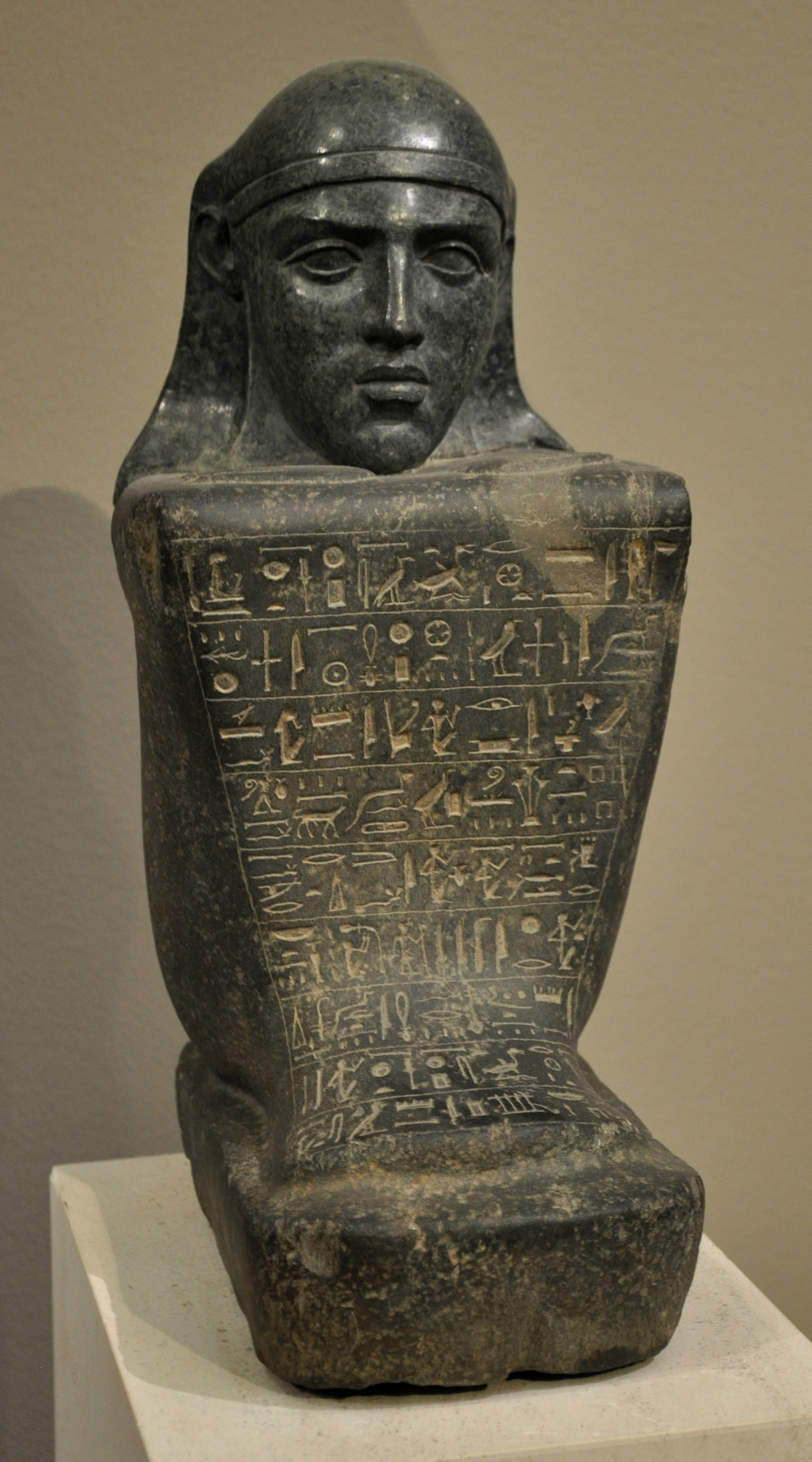
- Block statue of Nasekheperensekhmet
Egyptian name
n A s x p n sxm x t A1N3 sḫpr n sḫmt
- Dynasty: 26th Dynasty
- Pharaoh: Psamtik I
- Mother: Shepamuntashepet

Nasekheperensekhmet was an ancient Egyptian vizier who officiated most likely during the reign of pharaoh Psamtik I of the 26th Dynasty.

== Biography ==
Nasekheperensekhmet is known only from a block statue depicting him. From it, it is known that his mother was called Shepamuntashepet, and that he also held the charges of priest of Amun and governor of the city, beside being a vizier. During the 26th Dynasty there were two viziers at the same time, one for the North and one for the South of the country (Lower Egypt and Upper Egypt respectively); since the statue was found in Saqqara, it is likely that Nasekheperensekhmet was a Vizier of the North. The head of the statue is modern, made indeed during the 18th or 19th century when such "restorations" were not uncommon. The statue is nowadays exhibited at the Liebieghaus, in Frankfurt (Inv. No. 1449).
