= Ihy (vizier) =

Ancient Egyptian official

- Vizier of Egypt
- Tenure: c. 2360 BC
- Burial: Saqqara, Egypt

Ihy (fl. c. 2360 BC) was an Ancient Egyptian official of the Fifth Dynasty, in office most likely under king Unas. Ihy was vizier and was therefore the most important official at the royal court only second to the king. Next to the titles of a vizier, he was also overseer of the treasuries, overseer of the scribes of the king's document, overseer of all royal works and overseer of the double granary. These are also important titles, demonstrating his important position at the royal court.

Ihy was the owner of a mastaba near the Pyramid of Unas. However, the mastaba was usurped by the king's daughter Seshseshet with the beautiful name of Idut, daughter of king Teti. The names and titles of the vizier are only preserved on the sarcophagus in the burial chamber.

== Literature ==
- Strudwick, Nigel (1985). The Administration of Egypt in the Old Kingdom: The Highest Titles and Their Holders (PDF). Studies in Egyptology. London; Boston: Kegan Paul International. ISBN 978-0-7103-0107-9. Archived from the original (PDF) on 2014-04-03.
