= Sasobek =

Ancient Egyptian vizier

- Vizier of the North
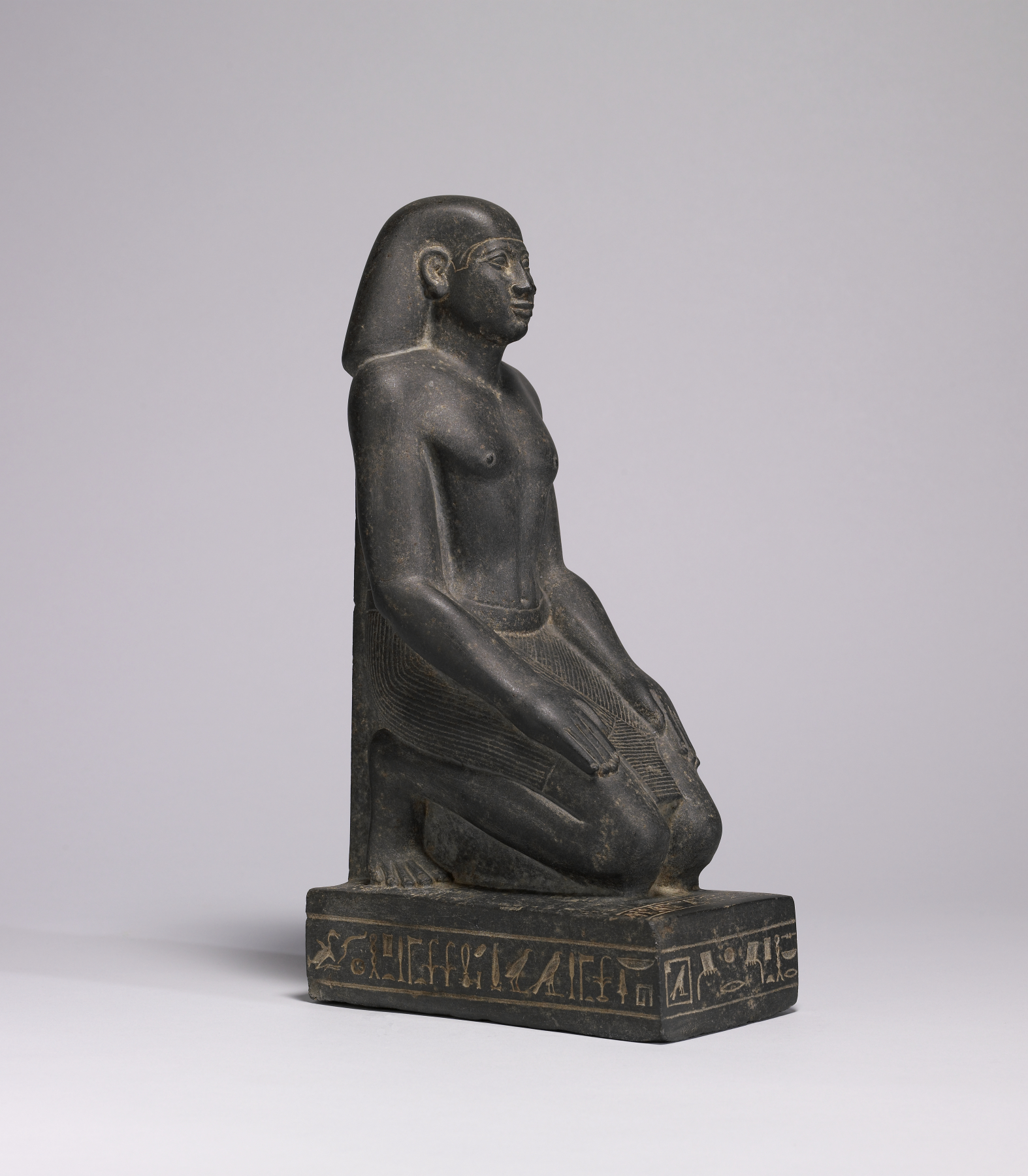
- Statue of Sasobek's son Horwedja, mentioning his father
Egyptian name
I4 G39 Z1S3-Sbk
- Dynasty: 25th–26th Dynasty
- Pharaoh: Psamtik I
- Children: Horwedja

Sasobek (Egyptian: "Son of Sobek") was an ancient Egyptian vizier, who officiated between the late 25th – early 26th Dynasty, during the reign of pharaoh Psamtik I. Being the "Vizier of the North", he resided and officiated from Sais, in Lower Egypt.

Sasobek is known from his fine siltstone sarcophagus which is now in the British Museum (EA 17), and also from a kneeling greywacke statue of his son Horwedja, now in the Walters Art Museum of Baltimore (22.79).
