= Thutmose (19th-dynasty vizier) =

Ancient Egyptian vizier

- Vizier of the South
Egyptian name
G26 F31 S29
- Dynasty: 19th Dynasty
- Pharaoh: Ramesses II

The Ancient Egyptian Noble Thutmose (Thutmosis) was Vizier during the latter part of the reign of Ramesses II during the 19th Dynasty.

Thutmose may have been a vizier of the south around year 45 of Ramesses II's reign. Thutmose is mentioned in vizier Prehotep II's tomb in Sedment, which may indicate that their tenures as viziers may have overlapped or followed one another. Tuthmose is also known from an ostracon found in the Valley of the Kings in Thebes.
