= Minnefer (vizier) =

Ancient Egyptian official

- Vizier of Egypt
- Tenure: c. 2450 BC
- Pharaoh: Ini
- Burial: Saqqara, Egypt

Minnefer (also Minufer; fl. c. 2450 BC) was an Ancient Egyptian official during the reign of king Nyuserre Ini. He bears the titles of a vizier and was therefore the highest official at the royal court, second only to the king. He was also overseer of all royal works, a title often held by viziers. Minnefer is known from different sources. He is depicted in the funerary temple of king Nyuserre Ini at Abusir providing firm evidence for his dating under this king. He is named on a short quarry-mark painted on a stone that was found in a wall around the pyramid complex of king Neferirkare Kakai. He is mentioned in papyri found at Abusir, that dates under Djedkare Isesi. He is also known from his sarcophagus that is now in the Rijksmuseum van Oudheden in Leiden. His mastaba was found at Saqqara. It is not yet published. The quarry marks on the Pyramid of Neferirkare Kakai indicate that he helped build his pyramid. Neferirkare Kakai ruled before Nyuserre. That means that Minnefer was either very long in office, or that the pyramid complex was finished under Nyuserre. The reference under king Djedkare Isesi refers to a phyle (group of priests) named after Minnefer. That might indicate that the vizier was later honored, perhaps with the cult of a statue.

== Bibliography ==
- Altenmüller, Hartwig (2001). "Old Kingdom: Fifth Dynasty". In Redford, Donald B. (ed.). The Oxford Encyclopedia of Ancient Egypt, Volume 2. Oxford University Press. pp. 597–601. ISBN 978-0-19-510234-5.
- Petra Andrassy: Zur Organisation und Finanzierung von Tempelbauten im Alten Ägypten, in: Martin Fitzenreiter (Hrsg.), Das Heilige und die Ware. Zum Spannungsfeld von Religion und Ökonomie, Berlin, London 2007, ISBN 978-1906137038, pp. 143–164; online
- Strudwick, Nigel (1985). The Administration of Egypt in the Old Kingdom: The Highest Titles and Their Holders (PDF). Studies in Egyptology. London; Boston: Kegan Paul International. ISBN 978-0-7103-0107-9.
