= Amenemhatankh (vizier) =

Ancient Egyptian vizier

- Vizier of Egypt
Egyptian name
< i mn n m HAt t > anx(ỉmn-m-ḥ3.t)-ˁnḫ
- Tenure: c. 1900 BC
- Dynasty: 12th Dynasty

Amenemhat-ankh (fl. c. 1900 BC) was an ancient Egyptian vizier during the Twelfth Dynasty, in the Middle Kingdom period.

== Career ==
He is known only by a shattered false door made from pink granite; the fragments contain his name, two titles ("dignitary" and "vizier"), and the initial part of the conventional ancient Egyptian offering formula. The false door is of unknown provenience, but it is possible that it was unearthed by French archaeologist Jacques Morgan at the end of the 19th century, during his excavations at Dahshur. The finding then found its way to an auction on whose catalogue it was spotted in 1996. It appeared again on the art market in 2015.

Amenemhatankh is a basilophorous name, meaning "(king) Amenemhat lives": "Amenemhat" is enclosed in a cartouche, which is a royal prerogative. From that, it has been deduced that Amenemhatankh must be dated to no earlier than the 12th Dynasty, because the earliest kings named Amenemhat are indeed members of that dynasty.
