= Ameny (vizier under Amenemhat III) =

Egyptian vizier

- Vizier of Egypt
- Dynasty: 12th Dynasty
- Spouse: Sehetepibre-Nehy

Ameny was an ancient Egyptian vizier who lived in the late Twelfth Dynasty.

== Biography ==
Ameny is only known from rock inscriptions near Aswan in Upper Egypt. Here many officials of the region but also court officials passing by on missions carved texts into the rocks, that often name their titles and family members. Amneny bears here the titles overseer of the city and vizier. His wife Sehetepibre-Nehy is mentioned in the inscriptions and she is known from other monuments as the daughter of the overseer of troops Ameny who lived for sure under Senusret III or Amenemhat III providing also a date for the vizier Ameny.

== Weblink ==
- Ameny on Persons and Names of the Middle Kingdom
