= Sekhem-ankh-Ptah =

Ancient Egyptian official

- Vizier of Egypt
Egyptian name
p t H s S42 Aa1 m S34
- Tenure: c. 2360 BC
- Burial: Giza, Giza Governorate, Egypt
- Spouse: Bunefer
- Children: 2

Sekhem-ankh-Ptah (also Sekhemankhptah and Sekhemankh-Ptah; fl. c. 2350 BC) was an ancient Egyptian high official who lived during the Old Kingdom period. His main title was that of a vizier, making him the most important official at the royal court, second only to the king. Other important titles of Sekhem-ankh-Ptah were "Overseer of all royal works" and "Overseer of the scribes of the king's document".

Sekhem-ankh-Ptah is mainly known from his mastaba (G7152) discovered by George Reisner at Giza. The dating of Sekhem-ankh-Ptah is uncertain and ranges in scholarly literature from the Fifth Dynasty to the Sixth Dynasty.

Sekhem-ankh-Ptah was married to a woman named Bunefer, who might have been the daughter of a king as indicated by her title "King's daughter of his body". She has her own false door on the East, outside of the mastaba. Two children of Sekhem-ankh-Ptah are also known. On the West wall of the mastaba cult chamber is shown the "Eldest son, official (z3b), overseer of scribes" and "Scribe of the king's documents in front of him" Seshemnefer. On the East wall appears the "Beloved daughter" Merites.

== Literature ==
- Badawy, Alexander (1976). The tombs of Iteti, Sekhemʻankh-Ptah, and Kaemnofert at Giza. Berkeley: University of California Press. pp. 15–23, figs. 18-24, pls. 14-23. ISBN 978-0-52-009544-1.
- Callender, Vivienne (2002). "A Contribution to the Burial of Women in the Old Kingdom" (PDF). Archiv Orientální. 70 (3): 301–308.
- Strudwick, Nigel (1985). The Administration of Egypt in the Old Kingdom: The Highest Titles and Their Holders (PDF). Studies in Egyptology. London; Boston: Kegan Paul International. ISBN 978-0-7103-0107-9. Archived from the original (PDF) on 2014-04-03.
