= Overseer of Upper Egypt =

The Overseer of Upper Egypt was an important Ancient Egyptian title during the Old and Middle Kingdom periods. The title appears first in the early Fifth Dynasty. The first title holder is the vizier Kay, who possibly lived during the reigns of Neferirkare Kakai and Nyuserre Ini. The office is well attested in the following years. Most titles holders had other high titles, many of them were viziers. In the Fifth Dynasty, the Egyptian provinces became more important. The central government installed an office in charge of the provinces. The first title holders were all officials at the royal residence. In later times also local officials were bearing the title.
