= Merysekhmet =

Vizier of Ancient Egypt

- Vizier of the North
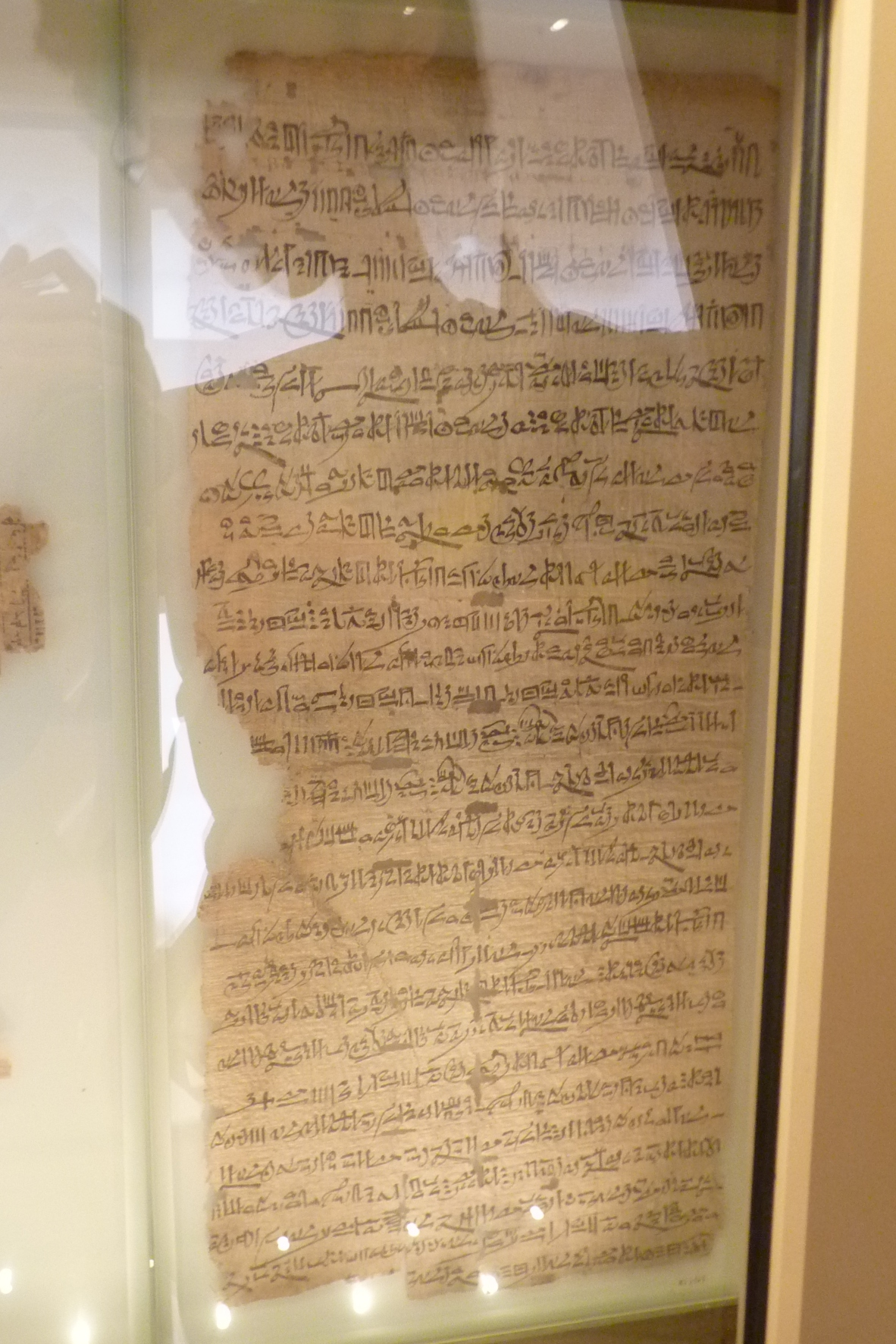
- Papyrus Bologna 1086, mentioning Merysekhmet
Egyptian name
mr i i A2 sxm x t Z5
- Dynasty: 19th Dynasty
- Pharaoh: Merenptah (Year 3?)

Merysekhmet, also written Merysakhmet (mrỉỉ-sḫm.t; "Beloved of Sekhmet") was a vizier of Ancient Egypt. He served during the reign of Merenptah (reigned 1213-1203 BCE).

Merysekhmet is mentioned in Papyrus Bologna 1086, which is a letter from the scribe of the offering table Bakenamun to his father Ramose who was a prophet of the temple of Thoth in Memphis. The letter is in regard to the whereabouts of a Syrian slave named Nekedy. Bakenamun mentions meeting with vizier Merysekhmet and asking if Nekedy was with him, and being told no. In the letter, which is exhibited at the Archeological Civic Museum of Bologna, is mentioned a Year 3 (of Merenptah) so is likely that Merysekhmet was in charge around this date.
