= Teti (vizier) =

Ancient Egyptian vizier

- Vizier of Egypt
- Tenure: c. 2230 BC
- Pharaoh: Pepi II
- Burial: Badrshein, Giza, Egypt

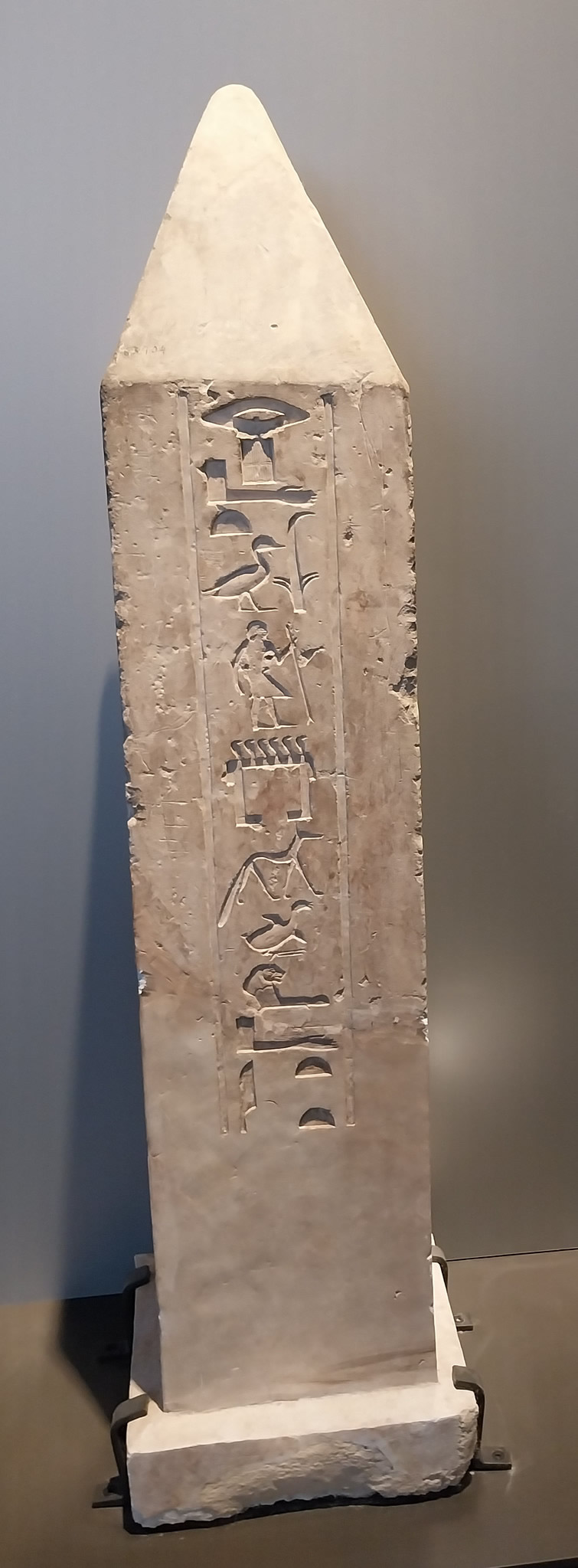
Obelisk of Teti

Teti (fl. c. 2230 BC) was an Ancient Egyptian vizier from the end of the Old Kingdom. He is known from his tomb excavated near the pyramid complex of king Pepi II. His tomb is a big building (23 × 18 m). There was found an inscribed false door and an inscribed obelisk; these and further inscriptions provide the name and titles of Teti. His main function was that of a vizier, but he was also father of the god, beloved of the god, hereditary prince, king's eldest son and foster child of the king. These are all rare and exceptional important titles that indicate that Teti was a powerful official. He most likely dates to the end of Pepi's II reign. He was also overseer of the granaries and overseer of the treasury, titles often held by a vizier.
