= Pensekhmet =

Ancient Egyptian high official

- Vizier of the South
- Dynasty: 19th Dynasty
- Pharaoh: Merenptah

Pensekhmet was a vizier of ancient Egypt. He served during the reign of Merenptah (reigned 1213-1203 BCE).
