= Qar (vizier) =

Ancient Egyptian vizier

- Vizier of Egypt
- Tenure: c. 2300 BC
- Pharaoh: Pepi I
- Children: Qar; Senedjemib; Inti; Tjenti

Qar (fl. c. 2300 BC) was an ancient Egyptian vizier who lived in the 6th Dynasty. The vizier was the most important official at the Ancient Egyptian court, only second to the king himself.

Qar is mainly known from his tomb complex discovered in 1995 at Abusir, by a Czech expedition. Before becoming vizier, Qar held a minor position with the title zab. Later he was promoted to the position of the vizier and his tomb was enlarged. A new false door was made with the vizier's titles on it. Little is known about the life of Qar, but he had several sons: Qar, Senedjemib, Inti, and Tjenti. These sons had their own tombs north of that of their father. However, already in ancient times these tombs were deliberately destroyed. The decoration of the chapels was broken into small pieces. It seems that some of the sons were victims of power struggles at the royal court, while the vizier's tomb was not touched.
