= Khentika Ikhekhi =

Ancient Egyptian vizier

Khentika
- Vizier of Egypt
- Tenure: c. 2335 BC
- Pharaoh: Teti
- Burial: Saqqara, Giza, Egypt

Khentika with the beautiful name Ikhekhi (fl. c. 2335 BC) was an Ancient Egyptian official at the end the Old Kingdom, perhaps in office under king Teti and/or Pepi I. His main titles were that of a vizier, but he was also overseer of double treasuries, overseer of the double granaries and overseer of all royal works. He also had officies at the pyramid temples of Teti and Pepi I. Therefore, he might have been in office under those kings.

Khentika is mainly known from his mastaba at Saqqara, close to the pyramid of king Teti. The mastaba is a large complex with several rooms most of them decorated with reliefs. The underground burial chamber was decorated too and contains an inscribed sarcophagus. The decoration of the mastaba includes several longer texts including biographies. However, these texts are not well preserved. The facade of the tomb includes curses against everybody who might damage the tombː as for all men who will enter into this my tomb...they shall not be pure [as] they [should be pure]...Further, I shall seize his neck like a bird.

== Bibliography ==
- James, T. G. H. (1953)ː The mastaba of Khentika called Ikhekhi. Archaeological Survey of Egypt 30. London: London, Egypt Exploration Society.
- Strudwick, Nigel (1985). The administration of Egypt in the Old Kingdom: the highest titles and their holders (PDF). Studies in Egyptology. London, Boston: KPI. ISBN 978-0-71-030107-9. Archived from the original (PDF) on 2014-04-03.
- Strudwick, Nigel C. (2005): Texts from the Pyramid Age, Society of Biblical Lit, Atlanta, ISBN 1589831381
