= Niankhba =

Ancient Egyptian official

- Vizier of Egypt
- Pharaoh: Unas
- Burial: Saqqara, Egypt

Niankhba was an ancient Egyptian official from the end of the Fifth Dynasty, in office under king Unas. Niankhba was vizier, the most important official in the royal court. Niankhba is known from his mastaba next to the Pyramid of Unas. The mastaba was found heavily destroyed. His name and titles are only known from the inscriptions found in the burial chamber. The walls of the burial chamber were decorated. The sarcophagus in the burial chamber was inscribed.

== Literature ==
- Strudwick, Nigel (1985). The Administration of Egypt in the Old Kingdom: The Highest Titles and Their Holders (PDF). Studies in Egyptology. London; Boston: Kegan Paul International. ISBN 978-0-7103-0107-9. Archived from the original (PDF) on 2014-04-03.
