= Bakenrenef (vizier) =

Ancient Egyptian vizier

- Vizier of the North
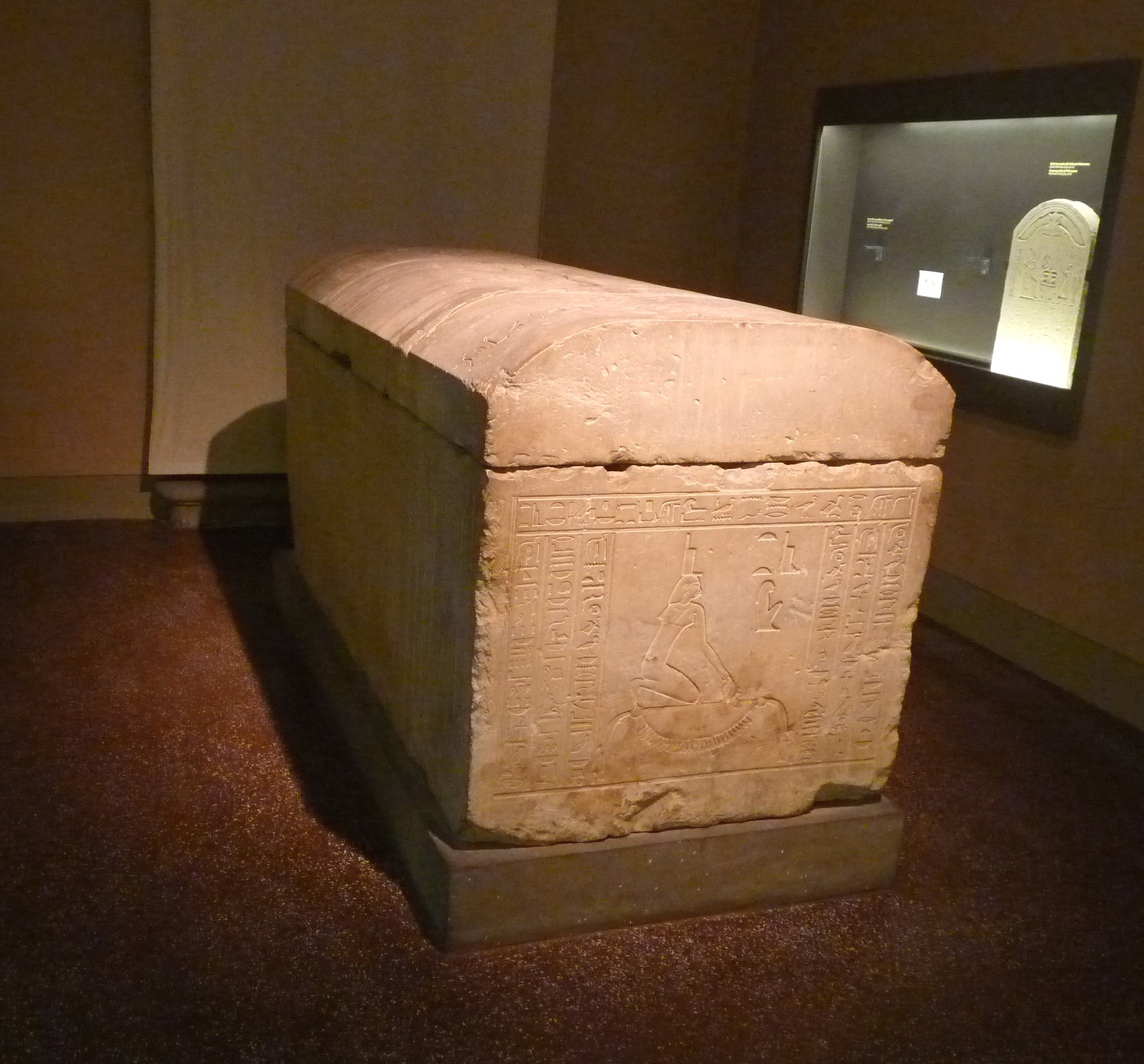
- Bakenrenef's sarcophagus in Florence
Egyptian name
G29 k n r&n&f
- Dynasty: 26th Dynasty
- Pharaoh: Psamtik I
- Burial: Rock tomb in Saqqara
- Father: Padineit
- Mother: Tageb

Bakenrenef or Bakenranef was an ancient Egyptian Vizier of the North (Lower Egypt) during the reign of Psamtik I (664 – 610 BC) of the 26th Dynasty. Like Khaemwaset several centuries before, he bore the title of Iunmutef, “Cleaner of the Great House”. His father was a mayor called Padineit, while his mother was a certain Tageb.

Bakenrenef is mainly known for his large rock tomb in Saqqara and its reliefs depicting scenes from the Book of the Dead and from the Amduat. The tomb was later reused for other burials during the 30th Dynasty. The decoration of the tomb was still largely intact when the Lepsius expedition discovered and copied it, in the middle of the 19th century. Since then, the grave has been vandalized: most reliefs were torn away from the walls and sold to various museums and private collectors. For about twenty years an Italian expedition worked there and Bakenrenef's limestone sarcophagus is now in the National Archaeological Museum of Florence.
