= Senewosret-Ankh (vizier) =

Egyptian vizier

- Vizier of Egypt
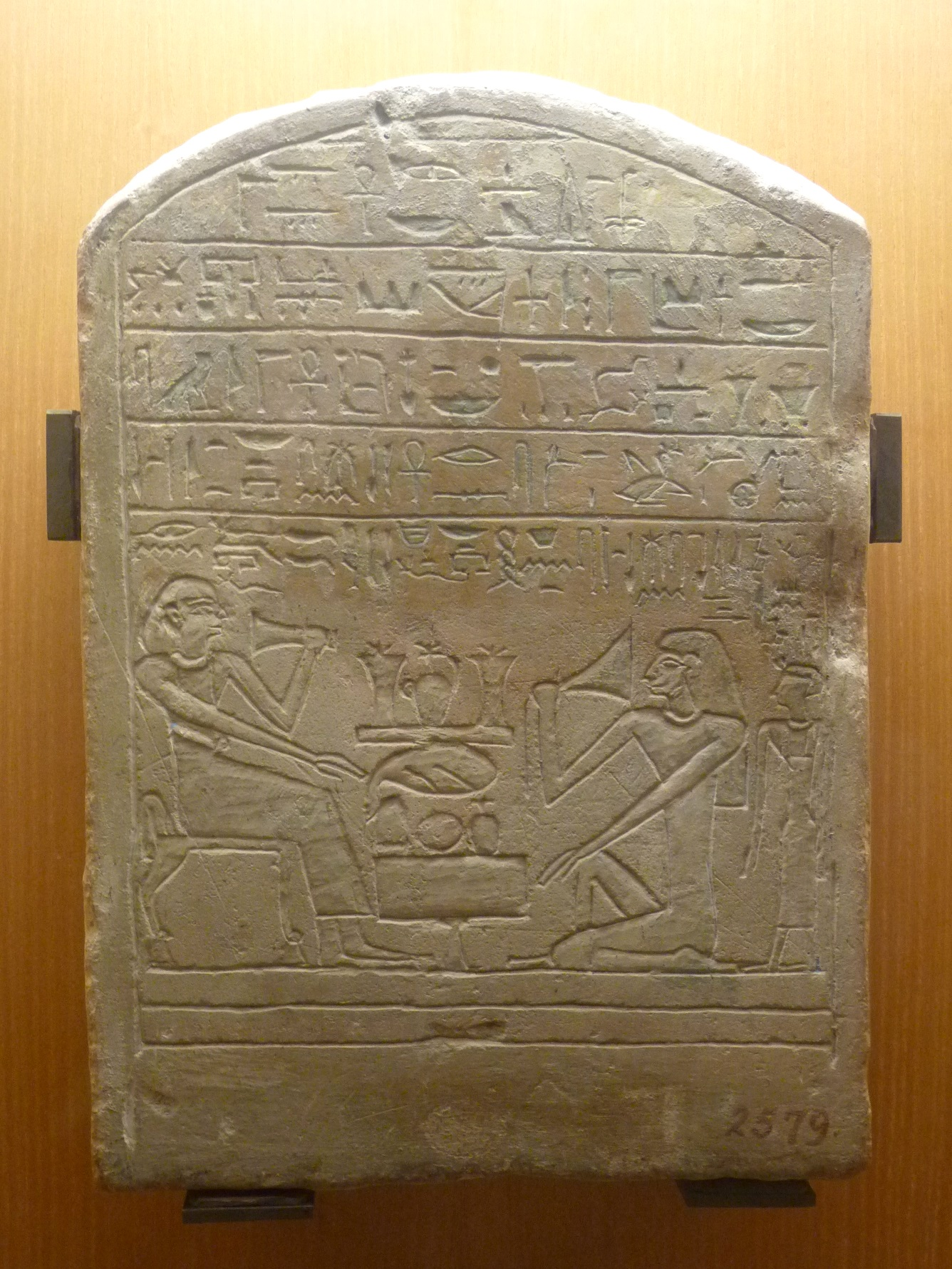
- Stele for Senewosret-Ankh in the National Archaeological Museum (Florence).
- Dynasty: 12th-13th dynasty
- Pharaoh: probably Amenemhat III and later
- Spouse: Henutsen
- Mother: {ttj-wꜣḏ.tj}
- Children: Zatamun

Senewosret-Ankh {s-n-wsrt-ꜥnḫ/snfrw} (also Senusret-Ankh; Senwosret-Ankh) was an ancient Egyptian vizier of the Middle Kingdom, dating to the end of the Twelfth or to the beginning of the Thirteenth Dynasty.

== Family ==
His spouse was Lady of the House {nbt pr}, Henutsen {ḥnwt⸗sn}. His daughter by Henutsen was Sat-Amun {sꜣt-jmn}. His mother was Lady of the House {nbt pr}, teti-wadj.ti {ttj-wꜣḏ.tj}. He had three brothers, the reporter Senusret-Seneb/Pantjeny, Iuseneb, and Ameny-Seneb.

== Attestations ==
He is known from a number of sources making it possible to reconstruct his career. He started as 'personal scribe of the king's document and was appointed from there to the overseer of fields. From this position he was most likely appointed to the position of the vizier. As vizier he is known from a statue found at Ugarit. The statue shows him and his wife Henutsen as well as his daughter Zatamun. The statue also mentioned that to him was given the gold of praise in front of all courtiers. It remains unknown for what reason he received that honour.

=== Seal bearer and scribe ===
==== Rock Inscription Petrie, Season, no. 86 ====
On the Aswan-Philae road, a rock inscription where he holds the titles “sealbearer of the bjtj-king” and “scribe of documents of the king of the presence”.

==== Rock Inscription Petrie, Season, no. 114 ====
On the Aswan-Philae road, a rock inscription where he holds the titles “sealbearer of the bjtj-king” and “scribe of documents of the king of the presence”.

=== Vizier ===
the vizier Senusret ankh and family, Statue found at Ugarit

==== Firenze 2579 ====
A limestone stela now in Florence is dedicated to Senewosret-Ankh by his Steward {jmj-rꜣ pr} Keki, one of the administrators of Senewosret-Ankh's estates. Senusret-Ankh {s-n-wsrt-ꜥnḫ} holds the title Overseer of the City {jmj-rꜣ njwt} and Vizier {ṯꜣtj}. The stela may display signs of a date in the early 13th Dynasty. The stela belongs to a Memphis-Faiyum workshop identified as "Marée, The Second Intermediate Period, 253 n. 93".

==== Louvre AO 15720 + AO 17223 ====
A greywacke family group statue found in Ugarit now in the Louvre Museum. Senusret-Ankh {s-n-wsrt-ꜥnḫ} holds the title Overseer of the City {jmj-rꜣ njwt}, Vizier {ṯꜣtj}, and Vizier {ṯꜣtj}. It is uncertain why the title vizier comes twice, perhaps he held two vizierates. It has a dedication to Ptah-Sokar. Dated to early 13th dynasty.

== Literature ==
- Wolfram Grajetzki: Court Officials of the Egyptian Middle Kingdom, London 2009 p. 35 ISBN 978-0-7156-3745-6
