= Ankhwennefer (vizier) =

Vizier of ancient Egypt

- Vizier of the North
- Dynasty: 26th dynasty
- Pharaoh: Psamtik I
- Father: Pakherenptah

Ankhwennefer was an ancient Egyptian vizier of the 26th Dynasty, who was in office under king Psamtik I (ruled 664–610 BC).

Ankhwennefer is only known from a statue that was seen in 1960 on the art market in Cairo. It is unknown what happened to the statue since then. The statue shows Ankhwennefer standing with a smaller statue of the god Ptah in front of him. The upper part of the statue is lost. On the back pillar is an inscription presenting his titles, his names and the name of the father (Pakherenptah). His titles include those of a vizier, but also titles connecting him with the temple of Ptah, with Sakhmet and with Apis. In the 26th Dynasty the office of the vizier was divided into two parts: one vizier was in charge for Upper Egypt, another vizier was in charge for Lower Egypt. Ptah and Apis are deities especially connected with Memphis in Lower Egypt. Therefore, he was most likely a vizier of Lower Egypt. Certain details of the statue point to a date of the statue under king Psamtik I.
