= Vizier (Ancient Egypt) =

Highest rank of official in Ancient Egypt

The vizier was the highest official in ancient Egypt to serve the pharaoh (the king) during the Old, Middle, and New Kingdoms.

"Vizier" is the generally accepted rendering, among Egyptologists, of the ancient-Egyptian tjati, tjaty, etc. The Instruction of Rekhmire (Installation of the Vizier), a New Kingdom text, defines many of the duties of the tjaty and lays down codes of behavior.

Viziers were often appointed by the pharaoh. During the 4th Dynasty and early 5th Dynasty, viziers were exclusively drawn from the royal family. From the period around the reign of Neferirkare Kakai onward, they were chosen according to loyalty and talent or inherited the position from their fathers.

== Responsibilities ==
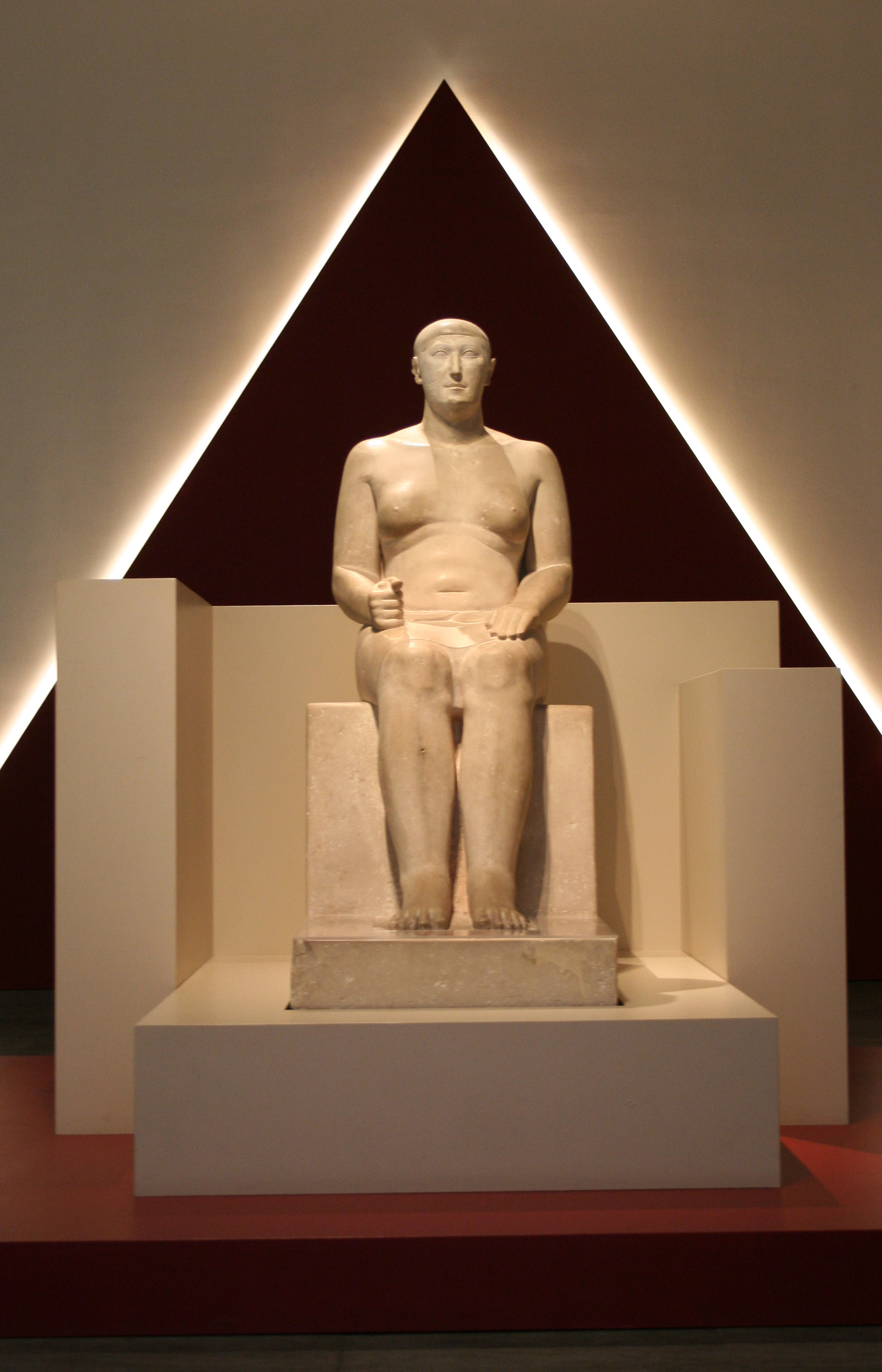
Statue of Hemiunu, vizier and designer of Khufu's pyramid, at the Roemer- und Pelizaeus-Museum Hildesheim, Germany. His feet rest on columns of Egyptian hieroglyphs, painted in yellow, red, brown, and black.

G47 t Z1 A1
Vizier (Tjaty)
in hieroglyphs
Era: New Kingdom
(1550–1069 BC)

The viziers were appointed by the pharaohs. The vizier's paramount duty was to supervise the running of the country, much like a prime minister. At times this included small details such as sampling the city's water supply. All other lesser supervisors and officials, such as tax collectors and scribes, reported to the vizier. The judiciary was part of the civil administration, and the vizier also sat in the High Court. At any time, the pharaoh could exert his own control over any aspect of government, overriding the vizier's decisions. The vizier also supervised the security of the pharaoh and the palace by overseeing the comings and goings of palace visitors. The viziers often acted as the pharaoh's seal bearer as well, and the vizier would record trade. From the Fifth Dynasty onwards, viziers, who by then were the highest civilian bureaucratic official, held supreme responsibility for the administration of the palace and government, including jurisdiction, scribes, state archives, central granaries, treasury, storage of surplus products and their redistribution, and supervision of building projects such as the royal pyramid. In the New Kingdom, there was a vizier for Upper Egypt and Lower Egypt each.

== Installation of the Vizier ==
According to the Installation of the Vizier, a New Kingdom document describing the office of the vizier, there were certain traits and behaviors that were required to be a vizier:

- Act by the law
- Judge fairly
- Do not act willfully or headstrong

== List of viziers ==
=== Early Dynastic period ===
Viziers of the Early Dynastic period
Vizier	Pharaoh	Dynasty	Comments
Rekhit	Narmer	1st Dynasty	Retired to look after the estates of Neithhotep in their older years
Saiset	Hor-Aha	1st Dynasty	Served as administrator of the Memphite region
Amka	Djer, Djet and Merneith's regency	1st Dynasty	Served as administrator of Her-sekhenti-dju. Retired as overseer of Royal Estates in the Delta.
Sewadjka	Djet and Den	1st Dynasty	Retired as overseer of Her-sekhenti-dju, one of the most prestigious offices of the 1st Dynasty
Hemaka	Den	1st Dynasty	Served as royal sealbearer and chancellor. First non-royal to hold such a position. First dual chancellor over Her-sekhenti-dju and Her-tepi-khet.
Henu-Ka	Semerkhet and Qa'a	1st Dynasty	Served both Pharaohs and supported Qa'a in his early reign
Menka	Nynetjer?	2nd Dynasty	Earliest known holder of the simplified direct title known as 'Tjaty'

=== Old Kingdom and First Intermediate Period ===
Viziers of the Old Kingdom
Vizier	Pharaoh	Dynasty	Comments
Kagemni I	Sneferu	4th Dynasty	Purported author of the Instructions of Kagemni. Not attested in contemporary sources.
Nefermaat	Khufu	4th Dynasty	Son of Sneferu and father of Hemiunu
Hemiunu	Khufu	4th Dynasty	Nefermaat's son, believed to have designed Khufu's pyramid
Kawab	Khufu	4th Dynasty	Eldest son and vizier of Khufu
Ankhhaf	Khafre	4th Dynasty	Son of Sneferu
Nefermaat II	Khafre	4th Dynasty	Nephew of Nefermaat the Elder, a son of Nefertkau I; a grandson of Sneferu
Minkhaf I	Khafre	4th Dynasty	Son of Khufu, vizier under Khafre
Khufukhaf I	Khafre	4th Dynasty	Son of Khufu, vizier under Khafre
Nikaure	Likely Menkaure	4th Dynasty	Son of Khafre
Ankhmare	Menkaure	4th Dynasty	Son of Khafre
Duaenre	Menkaure	4th Dynasty	Son of Khafre, vizier during the late 4th dynasty
Nebemakhet	Menkaure	4th Dynasty	Son of Queen Meresankh III
Iunmin I	Possibly Menkaure	4th Dynasty	Possibly son of Khafre, vizier during the late 4th dynasty
Babaef II	Shepseskaf	4th Dynasty	Likely a grandson of Khafre
Kanefer		4th or 5th Dynasty	
Possibly Seshathotep	Possibly Userkaf	5th Dynasty	It is not certain if Seshathetep held the titles of a vizier
Sekhemkare	Userkaf and Sahure	5th Dynasty	Son of Khafre and queen Hekenuhedjet
Werbauba	Sahure	5th Dynasty	
Washptah	Neferirkare Kakai	5th Dynasty	
Minnefer	Nyuserre Ini	5th Dynasty	
Ptahshepses	Nyuserre Ini	5th Dynasty	Became the son-in-law of Nyuserre Ini some time after his ascension to the throne.
Seshemnefer III	Nyuserre Ini	5th Dynasty	
Kay	Possibly Nyuserre Ini	5th Dynasty	
Pehenuikai	Possibly Nyuserre Ini	5th Dynasty	
Ptahhotep Desher	Menkauhor Kaiu and/or Djedkare Isesi	5th Dynasty	
Rashepses	Djedkare Isesi	5th Dynasty	
Ptahhotep	Likely Djedkare Isesi	5th Dynasty	
Ptahhotep I	Djedkare Isesi	5th Dynasty	Purported author of The Maxims of Ptahhotep
Akhethotep	Djedkare Isesi	5th Dynasty	Son of Ptahhotep I
Senedjemib Inti	Djedkare Isesi	5th Dynasty	
Senedjemib Mehi	Djedkare Isesi and Unas	5th Dynasty	possible son-in-law of Unas (or Djedkare Isesi), vizier during the early 6th dynasty
Ptahhotep II	Unas	5th Dynasty	
Akhethetep Hemi	Unas	5th Dynasty	
Ihy	Unas	5th Dynasty	
Niankhba	Unas	5th Dynasty	
Sekhem-ankh-Ptah		5th or 6th Dynasty	Dating uncertain, may have been the son-in-law of a Pharaoh
Nefersheshemre	Teti	6th Dynasty	
Kagemni	Teti	6th Dynasty	son-in-law of Teti
Mereruka	Teti	6th Dynasty	son-in-law of Teti
Khentika	Teti	6th Dynasty	
Mehu	Teti or Pepi I	6th Dynasty	
Ankhmahor	Teti – Pepi I	6th Dynasty	
Merefnebef	Possibly Userkare	6th Dynasty	Merefnebef was also named Fefi and Unasankh
Heri	Teti – Pepi I	6th Dynasty	May have participated in the assassination of Teti
Meryteti	Pepi I	6th Dynasty	grandson of Teti, son of Mereruka
Iunmin II	Pepi I	6th Dynasty	
Nebet	Pepi I	6th Dynasty	First woman appointed vizier, mother-in-law of Pepi I
Inenek-Inti	Pepi I	6th Dynasty	Consort of Pepi I
Tjetju	Pepi I	6th Dynasty	
Qar	Pepi I	6th Dynasty	
Djau	Pepi I	6th Dynasty	brother-in-law of Pepi I, son of Nebet
Rawer	Pepi I	6th Dynasty	
Weni	Merenre Nemtyemsaf I	6th Dynasty	Likely the same person as vizier Neferwenmeryre
Teti	Pepi II	6th Dynasty	
Hemre, Isi		6th or 8th Dynasty	
Pepyankh the Middle		6th or 8th Dynasty	
Pepyankh the Black		6th or 8th Dynasty	
Shemay	Neferkaure and Neferkauhor	8th Dynasty	son-in-law of Neferkauhor, nomarch of Coptos, later vizier
Idy	Possibly Neferirkare	8th Dynasty	son of Shemay

=== Middle Kingdom and Second Intermediate Period ===
Viziers of the Middle Kingdom and Second Intermediate Period
Vizier	Pharaoh	Dynasty	Comments
Bebi	Mentuhotep II	11th Dynasty	
Dagi	Mentuhotep II	11th Dynasty	
Amenemhat	Mentuhotep IV	11th Dynasty	Later succeeded Mentuhotep IV on the throne as Amenemhat I, first Pharaoh of the 12th Dynasty
Ipi	Amenemhat I	12th Dynasty	
Intefiqer	Amenemhat I Senusret I	12th Dynasty	He is indicated in the Wadi el-Hudi as being involved in military missions in Lower Nubia.
Senusret	Senusret I Amenemhat II	12th Dynasty	
Ameny	Amenemhat II	12th Dynasty	
Amenemhatankh	Possibly Amenemhat II	12th Dynasty	
Siese	Amenemhat II	12th Dynasty	
Nebit	Senusret III	12th Dynasty	
Khnumhotep III	Senusret III	12th Dynasty	
Kheti	Amenemhat III	12th Dynasty	
Ameny	Amenemhat III	12th Dynasty	
Zamonth	Amenemhat III	12th Dynasty	
Senewosret-Ankh		12th-13th Dynasty	
Khenmes		13th Dynasty	
Ankhu	Khendjer	13th Dynasty	
Resseneb		13th dynasty	Son of Ankhu
Iymeru		13th Dynasty	Son of Ankhu
Neferkare Iymeru	Sobekhotep IV	13th Dynasty	
Sobka called Bebi		13th Dynasty	
Ibiaw	Wahibre Ibiau or Merneferre Ay	13th Dynasty	
Sonbhenaf	Wahibre Ibiau or Merneferre Ay, or Sekhemre Sementawy Djehuty	uncertain	
Aya	Ini I	13th Dynasty	Aya was Governor of El Kab before being appointed vizier in year 1 of Ini I, as reported in the Juridical Stela
Ayameru		13th Dynasty	Ayameru was the younger son of Aya and succeeded him in office, as reported in the Juridical Stela

=== New Kingdom ===
Viziers of the New Kingdom
Vizier	Pharaoh	Dynasty	Comments
Tetinefer	Ahmose I?	18th Dynasty	Vizier of the North (Memphis)
Imhotep	Thutmose I	18th Dynasty	Vizier of the South (Thebes)
Aakheperreseneb	Thutmose I	18th Dynasty	Vizier of the South
Amethu called Ahmose	Thutmose II, Hatshepsut, Thutmose III	18th Dynasty	Vizier of the South
Useramen	Hatshepsut, Thutmose III	18th Dynasty	Vizier of the South
Neferweben	Thutmose III	18th Dynasty	Likely Vizier of the North
Rekhmire	Thutmose III	18th Dynasty	Vizier of the South
Amenemipet called Pairy	Amenhotep II, Thutmose IV	18th Dynasty	Vizier of the South
Seny	Thutmose IV	18th Dynasty	Vizier of the South
Hepu	Thutmose IV	18th Dynasty	Vizier of the South
Thutmose	Amenhotep III	18th Dynasty	Vizier of the North
Ptahmose	Amenhotep III	18th Dynasty	Vizier of the South
Amenhotep-Huy	Amenhotep III	18th Dynasty	Vizier of the North
Aperel	Amenhotep III, Akhenaten	18th Dynasty	Vizier of the North
Ramose	Amenhotep III, Akhenaten	18th Dynasty	Vizier of the South
Nakhtpaaten	Akhenaten	18th Dynasty	Vizier of the South
Pentu	Tutankhamun	18th Dynasty	Vizier of the South
Usermontu	Tutankhamun	18th Dynasty	Vizier of the South
Ay	Tutankhamun	18th Dynasty	Vizier of the South, later succeeded Tutankhamun on the throne as Ay
Seti	some time between Amenhotep III and Ramesses I	18th Dynasty	His title appears on monuments of his son Ramesses I
Paramessu	Horemheb	18th Dynasty	Later succeeded Horemheb on the throne as Ramesses I, first Pharaoh of the 19th Dynasty
Seti	Ramesses I	19th Dynasty	Was already the heir apparent to his father Ramesses I when made vizer. Later succeeded Ramesses I on the throne as Seti I
Nebamun	Horemheb, Ramesses I, Seti I, Ramesses II	18th Dynasty, 19th Dynasty	Vizier of the North
Paser	Seti I, Ramesses II	19th Dynasty	Vizier of the South
Nehi	Ramesses II	19th Dynasty	Vizier of the South
Khay	Ramesses II	19th Dynasty	Vizier of the South, ca. Year 27–45
Thutmose	Ramesses II	19th Dynasty	Vizier of the South, ca. Year 45–50.
Prehotep I	Ramesses II	19th Dynasty	Vizier of the North in ca year 40.
Prehotep II	Ramesses II	19th Dynasty	Vizier of the North in ca year 50.
Neferronpet	Ramesses II	19th Dynasty	Vizier of the South in ca year 50
Panehesy	Merneptah	19th Dynasty	Vizier of the South
Pensekhmet	Merneptah	19th Dynasty	Vizier of the South, Year 8
Merysekhmet	Merneptah	19th Dynasty	Vizier of the North, Year 3?
Amenmose	Seti II and Amenmesse	19th Dynasty	Vizier of the South
Khaemtir	Seti II and Amenmesse	19th Dynasty	Vizier of the South
Paraemheb	Seti II and Amenmesse	19th Dynasty	Vizier of the South
Hori II	Seti II, Siptah, Tausret, Sethnakht and Ramesses III	19th Dynasty	
Iuty		20th Dynasty	Vizier of the North?
Nehi?	Ramesses III	20th Dynasty	
Hewernef	Ramesses III	20th Dynasty	Vizier of the South
To	Ramesses III	20th Dynasty	Vizier of the South
Neferronpe	Ramesses IV to Ramesses VI	20th Dynasty	Vizier
Nehy	Ramesses VI	20th Dynasty	Vizier, son of Neferronpe
Mentehetef (Montu-hir-hetef)	Ramesses IX	20th Dynasty	Vizier of the South
Wennefer	Ramesses IX	20th Dynasty	Vizier of the South
Nebmarenakht also called Sahta-nefer	Ramesses IX, Ramesses X and Ramesses XI	20th Dynasty	Vizier of the South
Khaemwaset	Ramesses IX	20th Dynasty	Vizier of the South
Nebmarenakht also called Sahta-nefer (again)	Ramesses IX	20th Dynasty	Vizier of the South
Herihor	Ramesses XI	20th Dynasty	Vizier of the South

=== Third Intermediate Period ===
Viziers of the South
Vizier	Pharaoh	Year	Dynasty	Comments
Herihor	Smendes	c. 1075 BC	21st Dynasty	Was also the High Priest of Amun at Thebes
Pinedjem I	Smendes	c. 1070 BC	21st Dynasty	Was also the High Priest of Amun at Thebes
Amenhirpamesha	Psusennes I	c. 1040 BC	21st Dynasty	
Neseramun A	Siamun	c. 960 BC	21st Dynasty	Son of Nebneteru II a Letter Writer to the Pharaoh
Padimut A	Shoshenq I	c. 930 BC	22nd-23rd Dynasty	Vizier of the South
Ia-o	Osorkon I	c. 900 BC	22nd-23rd Dynasty	
Rudpamut	Takelot I	c. 880 BC	22nd-23rd Dynasty	
Hor	Takelot I	c. 876 BC	22nd-23rd Dynasty	
Hori	Takelot II	c. 845 BC	22nd-23rd Dynasty	Son of Iutjek?
Nespakheshuty A	Takelot II	c. 835 BC	22nd-23rd Dynasty	
Harsiese D	Shoshenq III	c. 825 BC	22nd-23rd Dynasty	
Hor VIII	Shoshenq III	c. 820 BC	22nd-23rd Dynasty	
Pentyefankh	Pedubast I	c. 815 BC	22nd-23rd Dynasty	
Harsiese E	Shoshenq III / Shoshenq IV	c. 790 BC	22nd-23rd Dynasty	
Djedkhonsefankh E	Shoshenq III / Osorkon III	c. 780 BC	22nd-23rd Dynasty	
Nakhtefmut C	Shoshenq III / Osorkon III	c. 775 BC	22nd-23rd Dynasty	
Hor X	Osorkon III	c. 770 BC	22nd-23rd Dynasty	Son of Nakhtefmut C
Pamiu	Osorkon III	c. 765 BC	22nd-23rd Dynasty	Vizier of the South
Pakharu	Takelot III	c. 760 BC	22nd-23rd Dynasty	Son of Pamiu
Ankh-Osorkon	Rudamun	c. 755 BC	22nd-23rd Dynasty	
Pediamonet	Iuput II	c. 750 BC	22nd-23rd Dynasty	Son of Pamiu
Harsiese F	Iuput II	c. 745 BC	22nd-23rd Dynasty	
Nesmin A	Iuput II	c. 740 BC	22nd-23rd Dynasty	Son of Harsiese F
Ankh-hor	Iuput II	c. 730 BC	22nd-23rd Dynasty	
Nespakheshuty B	Iuput II	c. 725 BC	22nd-23rd Dynasty	
Pediese	Iuput II	c. 720 BC	22nd-23rd Dynasty	Son of Harsiese F?
Paytjauembastet	?		25th Dynasty (?)	Vizier of the South
Khamhor A	?		25th Dynasty	Vizier of the South, Son of Harsiese F
Harsiese G Pahrer	?		25th Dynasty	Vizier of the South, Son of Khamhor A
Nesmin B	?		25th Dynasty	Vizier of the South, Son of Khamhor A
Mentuhotep	?		25th Dynasty	Vizier of the North
Nespaqashuty C	Shebitku		25th Dynasty	Vizier of the South
Harsiese R	?		25th Dynasty	Vizier of the North
Nespamedu	Taharqa		25th Dynasty	Vizier of the South, Son of Nespaqashuty C
Nespaqashuty D	?		25th-26th Dynasty	Vizier of the South, buried in TT312, Son of Nespademu
Djedkare	?		25th-26th Dynasty	Vizier of the North

=== Late Period ===
Viziers of the Late Period
Vizier	Pharaoh	Dynasty	Comments
Sasobek	Psamtik I	25th-26th Dynasty	Vizier of the North
Nasekheperensekhmet	Psamtik I	26th Dynasty	Vizier of the North
Bakenrenef	Psamtik I	26th Dynasty	Vizier of the North
Ankhwennefer	Psamtik I	26th Dynasty	Vizier of the North
Iry		26th Dynasty	Vizier of the South
Djedwebasettiuefankh		26th Dynasty	Vizier of the South
Iufaa	Psamtik I	26th Dynasty	Vizier of the North, father of Gemenefhorbak
Gemenefhorbak	Psamtik I	26th Dynasty	Vizier of the North
Harsomtusemhat		26th Dynasty	Vizier of the North
Psamtek-Meryneit	Amasis II	26th Dynasty	Vizier of the North
Pasherientaihet	Amasis II	26th Dynasty	Vizier of the North
Horsiese		26th Dynasty	Vizier of the North
Psamtikseneb	Nectanebo II	30th Dynasty	

=== Ptolemaic Period ===
Vizier	Pharaoh	Dynasty	Comments
Berenice II	Ptolemy III Euergetes	Ptolemaic dynasty	Wife of the Pharaoh, title attested at the Temple of Philae and Canopus Decree.
Cleopatra I Syra	Ptolemy V Epiphanes Ptolemy VI Philometor	Ptolemaic dynasty	Wife of the Ptolemy V, later regent for Ptolemy VI; title attested at the Temple of Edfu.

== See also ==
- Vizier
- Shogun
- Joseph (Genesis), who was considered as a vizier of Egypt in Biblical writings
