= Kagemni =

Ancient Egyptian vizier

- Vizier of Egypt
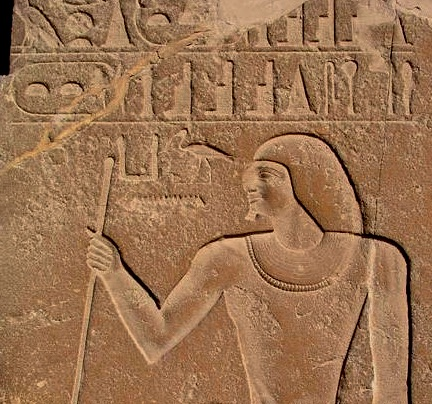
- Tenure: c. 2345 BC
- Dynasty: 6th Dynasty
- Pharaoh: Teti
- Burial: Tomb LS10 in the Teti Cemetery in Saqqara
- Spouse: Seshseshet Nubkhetnebty

Kagemni (fl. c. 2345 BC) was a vizier from the early part of the reign of King Teti of the Sixth Dynasty of Egypt. Kagemni's wife Seshseshet Nubkhetnebty was a King's daughter and the daughter of Teti.

== Biography ==
Kagemni held a great number of titles. He was an overseer of the two houses of gold and an overseer of the two treasuries. He also held several religious positions, including that of High Priest of Re and Stolist of Min. Other duties were related to the royal palace: overseer of the two chambers of the king's adornment, director of the Mansions of the White and Red Crowns and keeper of the head ornaments. As vizier, Kagemni also held the positions of overseer of the scribes of the king's documents, overseer of all the works of the king, and overseer of the six great courts. The exterior scenes cover the wall of the first room, while the scenes associated with the funeral meal are concentrated in the farthest part of the tomb. The inscriptions contain the names of the scenes, a description of the sacrifices and their provenance, as well as numerous titles of the Kagemni.

== Tomb ==
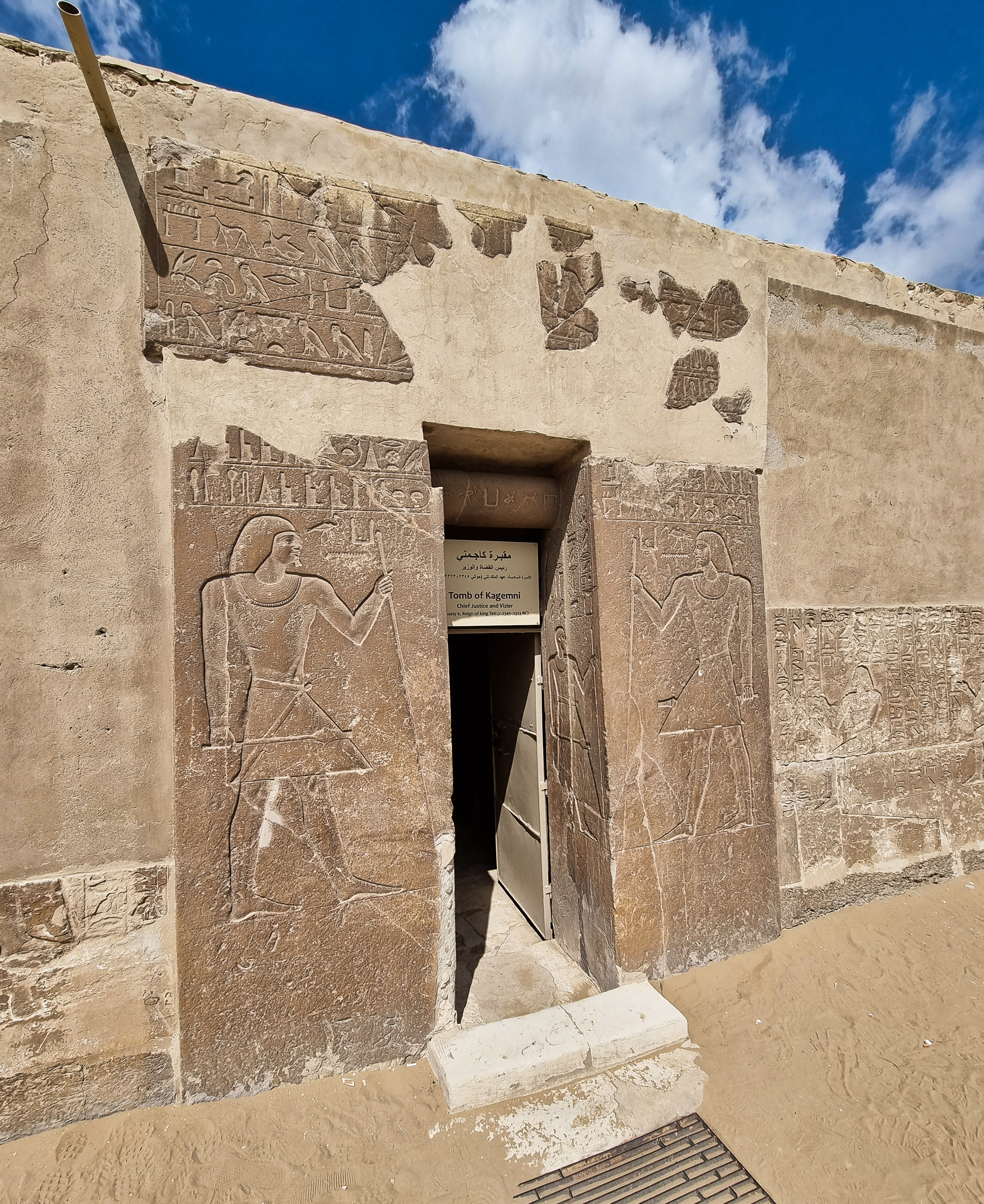
Tomb of Kagemni, Saqqara

Kagemni was buried in the largest mastaba in the Teti cemetery in Saqqara. The tomb is a large 32 m. x 32 m. square.

The mastaba was constructed of large blocks of limestone. Part of the mastaba consists of a chapel with six rooms, a pillared hall, five magazines, two chambers containing boats, a serdab and a staircase which gives access to the roof. The chapel walls are decorated and so are the walls of the burial chamber, which was located at the bottom of a shaft. The burial chamber contained an inscribed stone sarcophagus with a wooden coffin inside it.

The tomb consists of a hall right after the entrance, followed by a pillared hall and then a suite of rooms to the north of the pillared hall. The entrance hall contains scenes of daily life, including a scene with dancers. The pillared hall shows scenes of Vizier Kagemni on a boat which is accompanied by a small papyrus skiff carrying three men. There are scenes of fishing and scenes of the wildlife including crocodiles, dragonflies and frogs. Other scenes in the pillared hall show cattle, including a man carrying a calf and a cow being milked.

The rooms off the pillared hall show Kagemni in a carrying chair with attendants. This scene includes several of his titles. Other scenes in this room show birds including a scene where geese are being force fed. Another scene shows hyenas being force fed, in a manner very similar to that in the tomb of Mereruka.

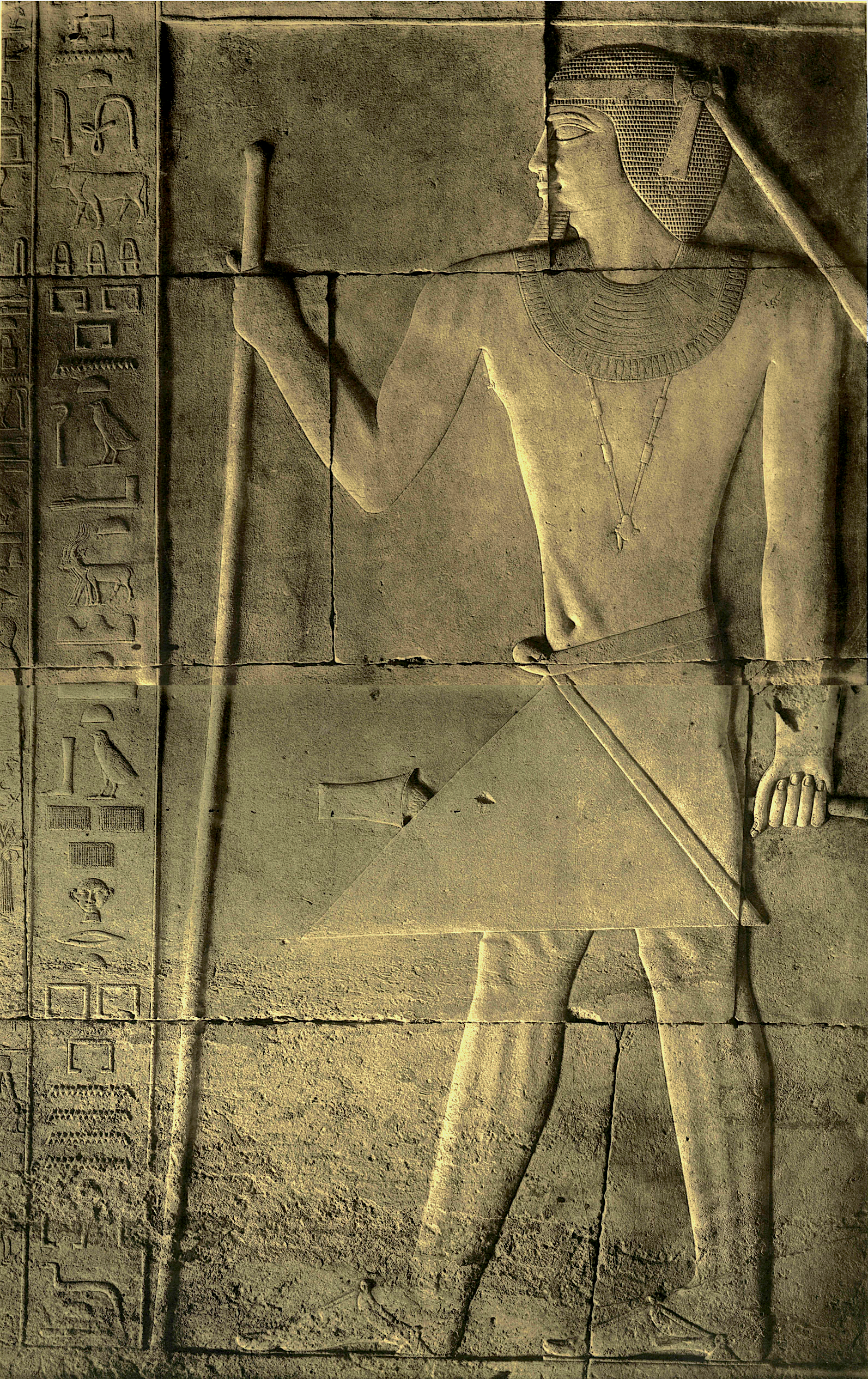
Vizier Kagemni, in the left column, a list of sacrificial offerings, fat cattle, poultry from the three courts, desert game and fruits from vast waters

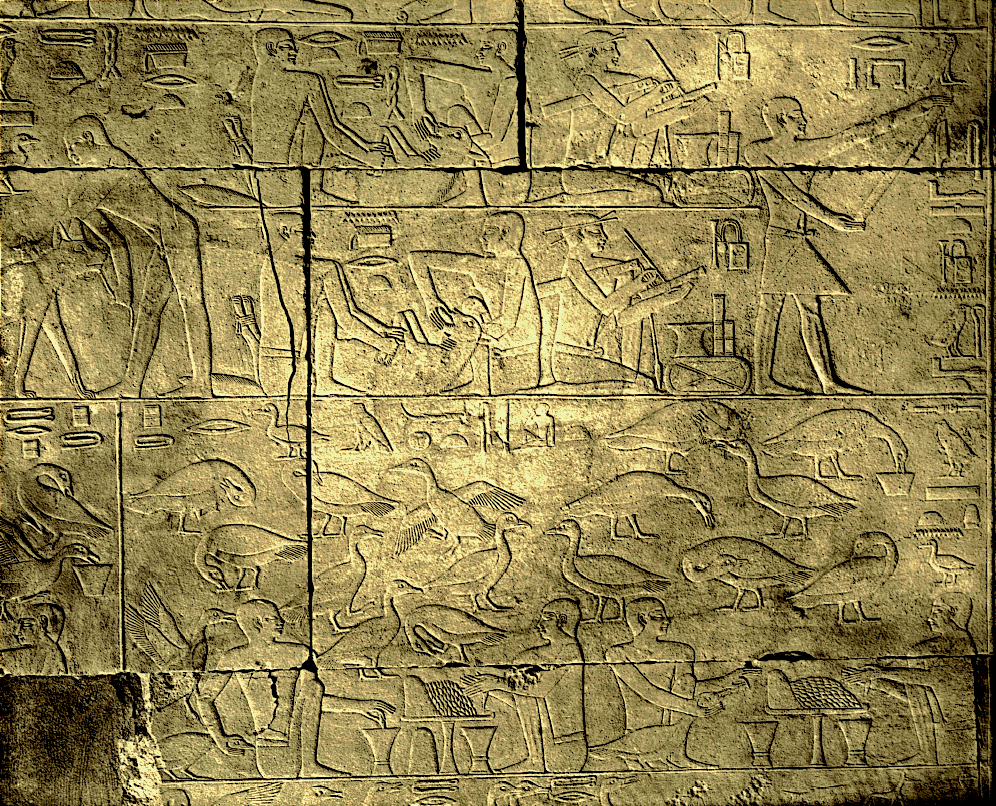
Mastaba Kagemni, decoration of the I.chamber, scribes and their representative, feeding of hyenas and domestic poultry

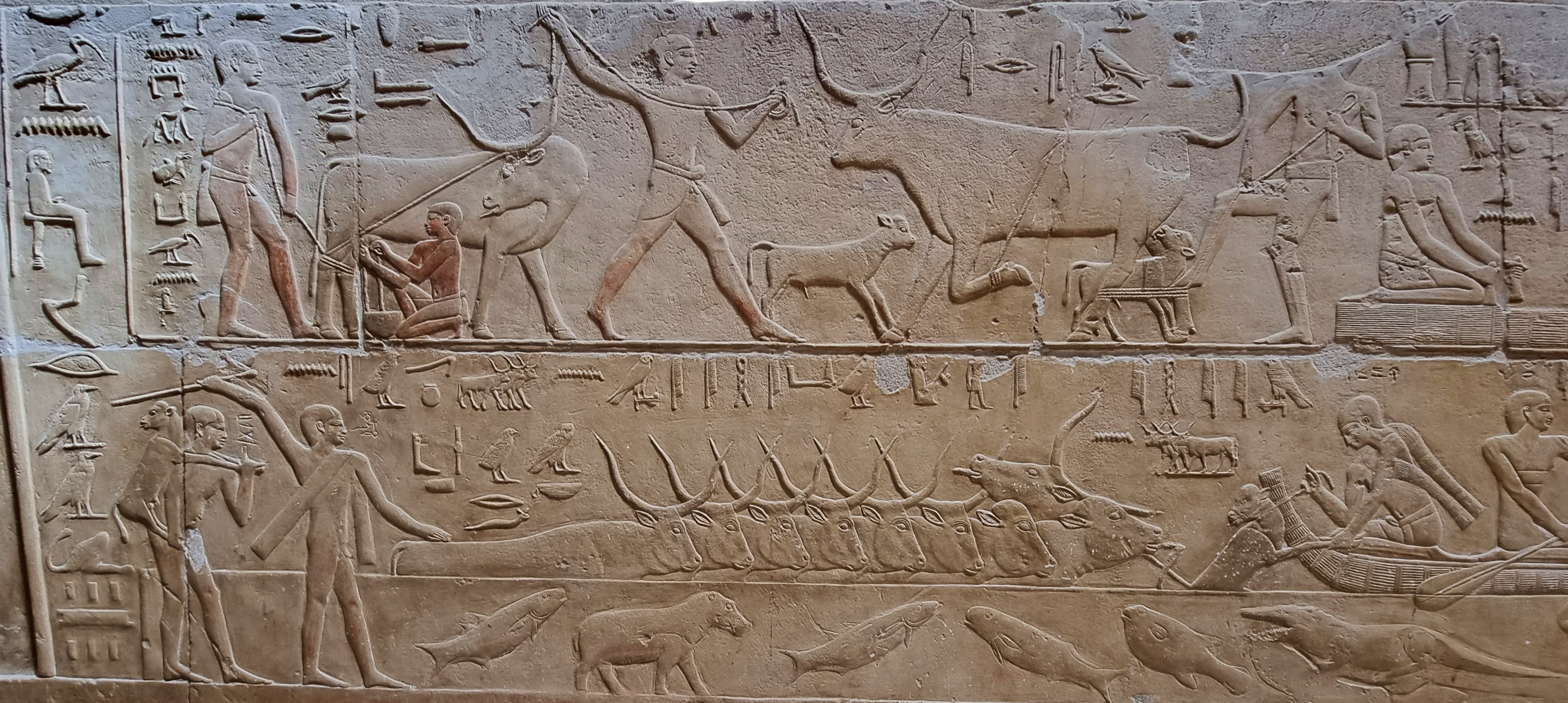
Livestock breeding

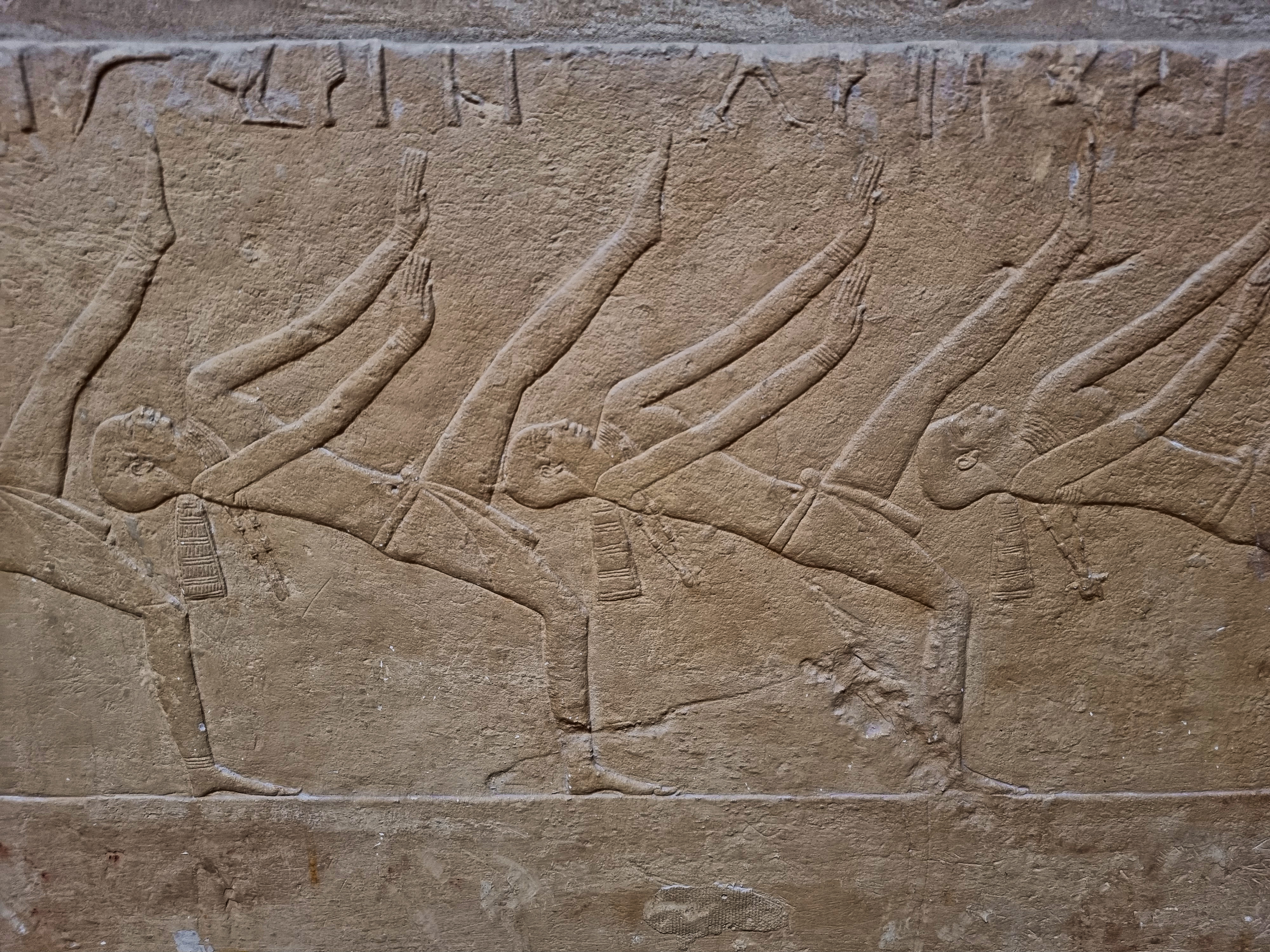
Dancers

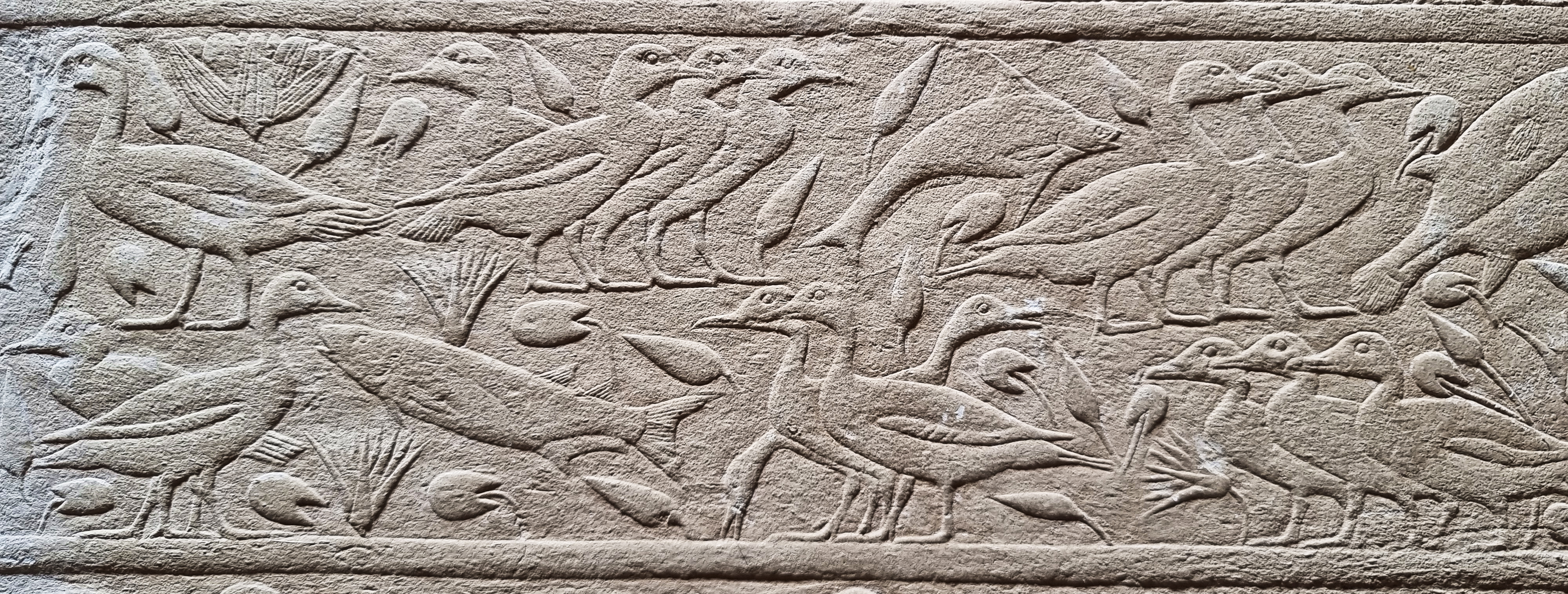
Geese in the river

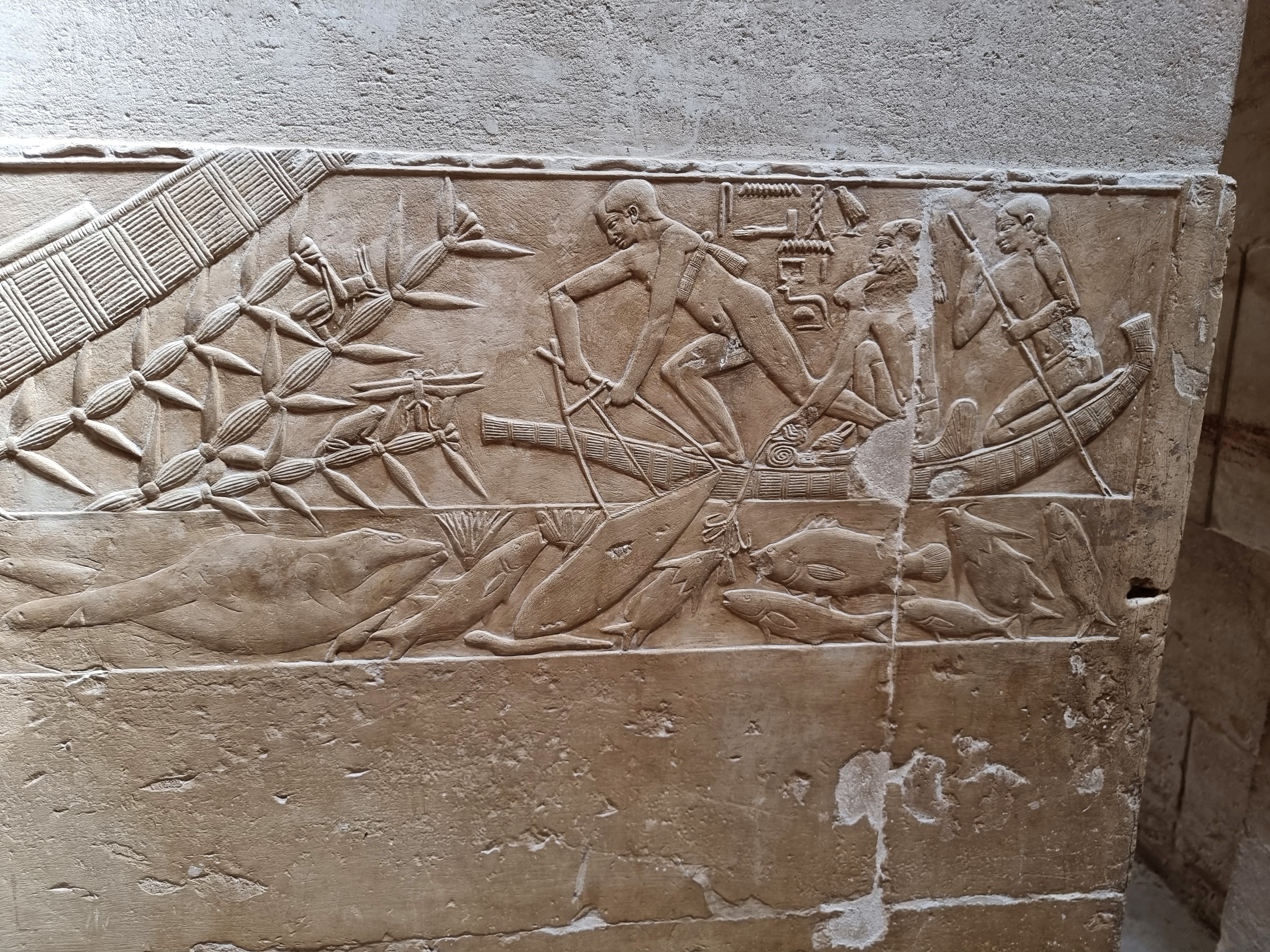
Fishing on a papyrus boat

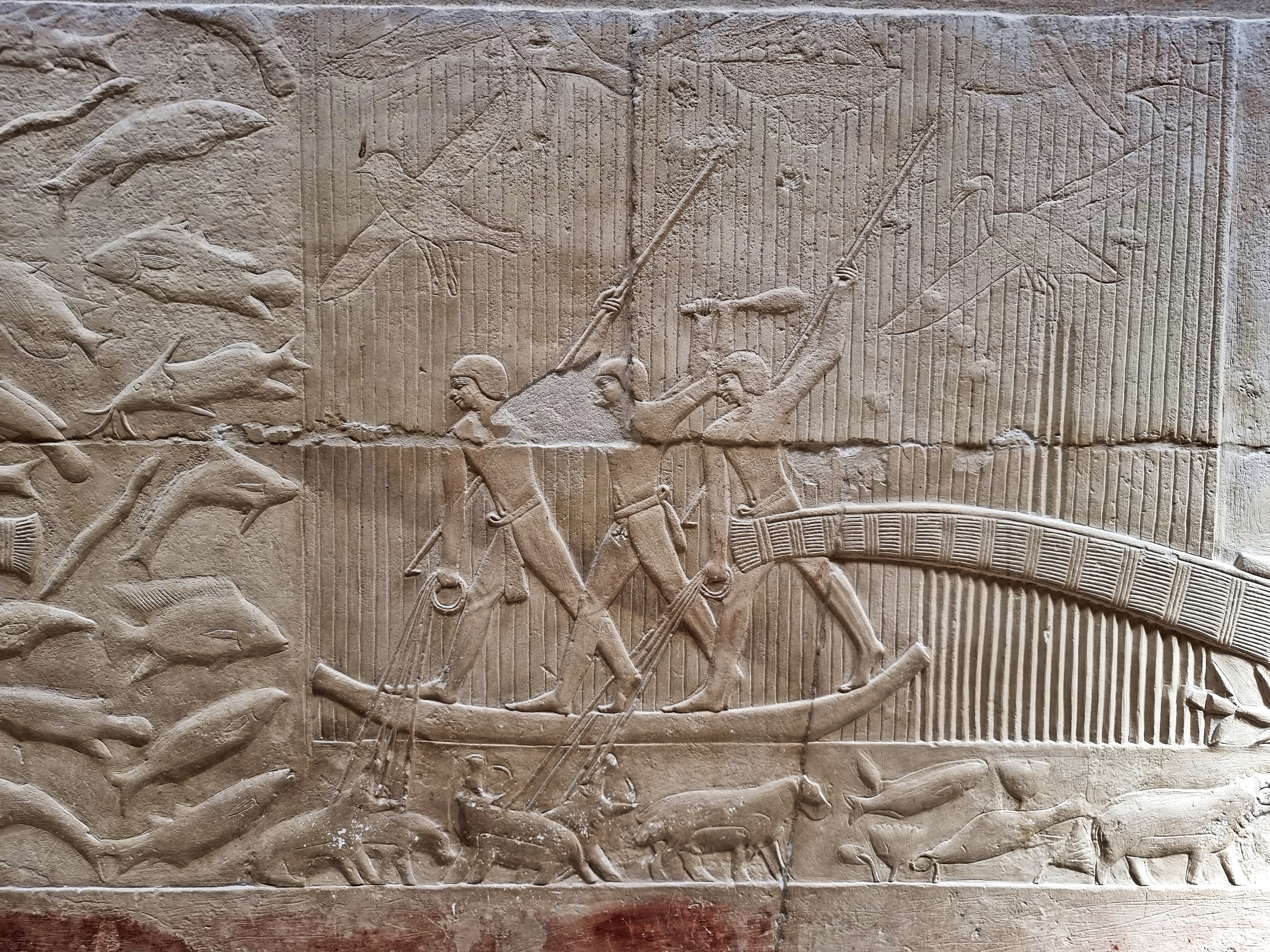
Hippo hunting
