= Overseer of the treasuries =

Ancient Egyptian title

m r pr HD pr HD
1imi-r prwy ḥḏ
in hieroglyphs

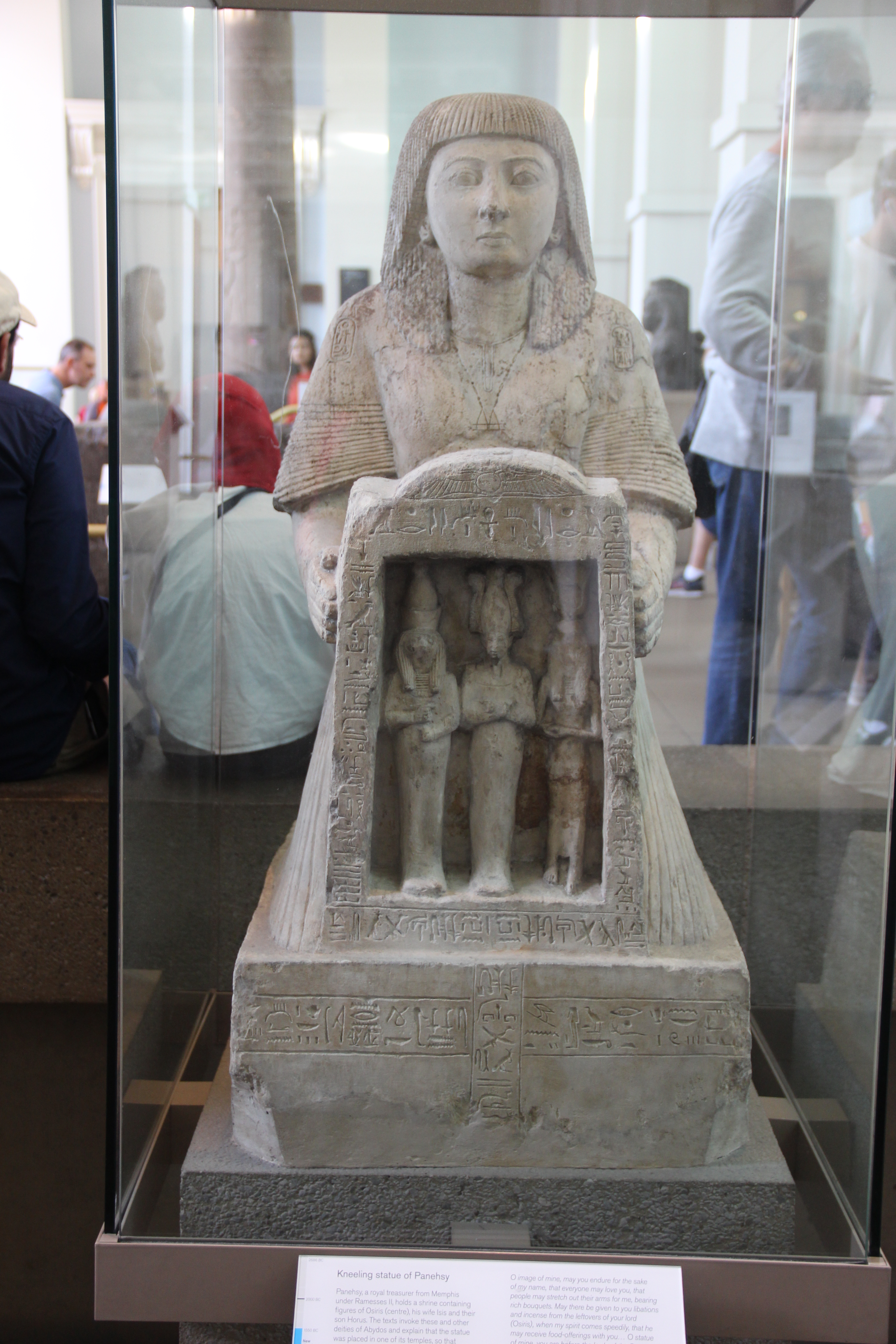
Egyptian Limestone Statue of Panehesy, Overseer of the Treasury, Thebes, 19th Dynasty

The overseer of the treasuries (alternative translation: overseer of the two treasuries; imy-r prwy ḥḏ) was a title and important role in the ancient Egyptian court of the Old and New Kingdom. The title is also attested in the Late Period.

The title is first attested in the Fourth Dynasty. The title fell out of use in the Middle Kingdom but reappeared by the New Kingdom, and it became one of the more important roles in the affairs of the royal court. The treasury was the place in the royal palace where precious materials were stored, such as metal objects, but also linen. Therefore, the overseer of the treasuries was responsible for administrating the resources of the country.

The writing of the title varies between ""overseer of the treasury" (imy-r pr ḥḏ) and "overseer of the two treasuries" (imy-r prwy ḥḏ). It is not always clear whether this relates to different functions.
