= Pyramid of Unas =

Fifth Dynasty Egyptian pyramid complex

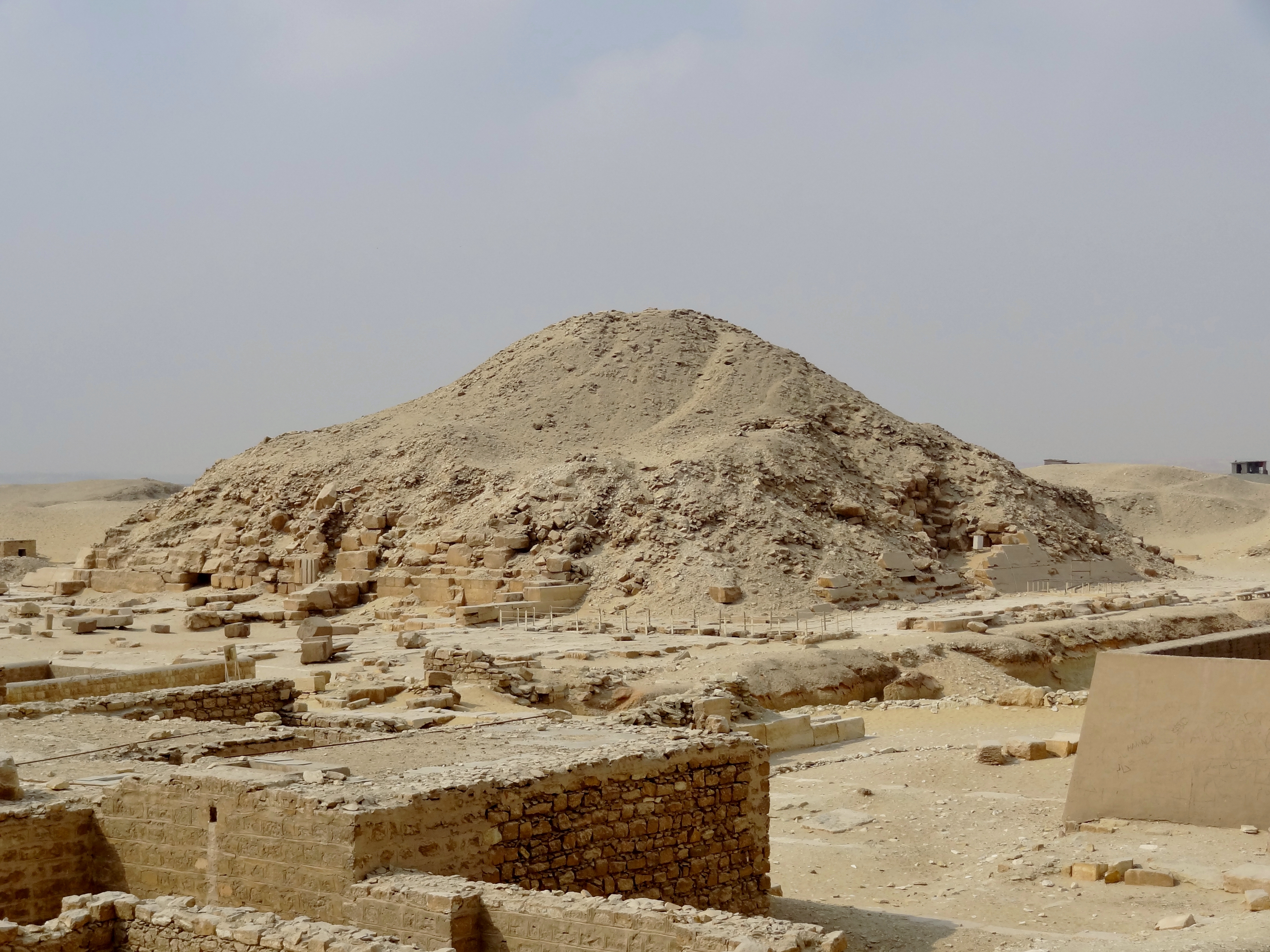

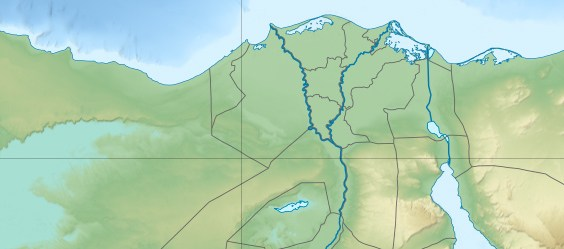
- Location within Lower Egypt
- 29°52′6″N 31°12′53″E
- Owner: Unas
Ancient name
- < E34 N35 M17 S29 > F35 Q1 Q1 Q1 O24
- Nfr swt Wnjs
- Nefer asut Unas
- "Beautiful are the [cult] places of Unas"
- Alternatively translated as "Perfect are the places of Unas" or "The places of Unas are complete"
- Constructed: Fifth Dynasty
- Type: Smooth-sided (now ruined)
- Material: Limestone
- Height: 43 m (141 ft; 82 cu) (original)
- Base: 57.75 m (189 ft; 110 cu)
- Volume: 47,390 m^{3} (61,980 cu yd)
- Slope: 56°18'35"

The pyramid of Unas (Egyptian: Nfr swt Wnjs, lit. 'Beautiful are the places of Unas') is the funerary monument built for the Egyptian pharaoh Unas, the ninth and final king of the Fifth Dynasty, in the 24th century BC. (Note: Proposed dates for Unas's reign: c. 2404–2374 BC, c. 2375–2345 BC, c. 2356–2323 BC, c. 2353–2323 BC, c. 2312–2282 BC, c. 2378/48–2348/18 ± 1–3 years BC.) It is the smallest Old Kingdom pyramid, but significant due to the discovery of Pyramid Texts – spells for the king's afterlife – incised into the walls of its subterranean chambers. Inscribed for the first time in Unas's pyramid, the tradition of these funerary texts carried on in the pyramids of subsequent rulers through to the end of the Old Kingdom, and into the Middle Kingdom through the Coffin Texts that form the basis of the Book of the Dead.

Unas built his pyramid between the complexes of Sekhemket and Djoser, in North Saqqara. Anchored to the valley temple at a nearby lake, a long causeway was constructed to provide access to the pyramid site. The causeway had elaborately decorated walls covered with a roof which had a slit in one section allowing light to enter, illuminating the images. A long wadi was used as a pathway. The terrain was difficult to negotiate and contained old buildings and tomb superstructures. These were torn down and repurposed as underlay for the causeway. A significant stretch of Djoser's causeway was reused for embankments. Tombs that were on the path had their superstructures demolished and were paved over, preserving their decorations. Two Second Dynasty tombs, presumed to belong to Hotepsekhemwy, Nebra, and Ninetjer, from seals found inside, are among those that lie under the causeway. The site was later used for numerous burials of Fifth Dynasty officials, private individuals from the Eighteenth to Twentieth Dynasties, and a collection of Late Period monuments known as the "Persian tombs".

The causeway joined the temple in the harbour with the mortuary temple on the east face of the pyramid. The mortuary temple was entered on its east side through a large granite doorway, seemingly constructed by Unas's successor, Teti. Just south of the upper causeway are two long boat pits. These may have contained two wooden boats: the solar barques of Ra, the sun god. The temple was laid out in a similar manner to Djedkare Isesi's. A transverse corridor separates the outer from the inner temple. The entry chapel of the inner temple has been completely destroyed, though it once contained five statues in niches. A feature of the inner temple was a single quartzite column that was contained in the antichambre carrée. The room is otherwise ruined. Quartzite is an atypical material to use in architectural projects, though examples of it being used sparingly in the Old Kingdom exist. The material is associated with the sun cult due to its sun-like coloration.

The underground chambers remained unexplored until 1881, when Gaston Maspero, who had recently discovered inscribed texts in the pyramids of Pepi I and Merenre I, gained entry. Maspero found the same texts inscribed on the walls of Unas's pyramid, their first known appearance. The 283 spells in Unas's pyramid constitute the oldest, smallest and best preserved corpus of religious writing from the Old Kingdom. Their function was to guide the ruler through to eternal life and ensure his continued survival even if the funerary cult ceased to function. In Unas's case, the funerary cult may have survived the turbulent First Intermediate Period and up until the Twelfth or Thirteenth Dynasty, during the Middle Kingdom. This is a matter of dispute amongst Egyptologists, where a competing idea is that the cult was revived during the Middle Kingdom, rather than having survived until then.

== Location and excavation ==
The pyramid is situated on the Saqqara plateau and lies on a line running from the pyramid of Sekhemkhet to the pyramid of Menkauhor. The site required the construction of an exceptionally long causeway to reach a nearby lake, suggesting the site held some significance to Unas.

The pyramid was briefly examined by John Shae Perring, and soon after by Karl Richard Lepsius, who listed the pyramid on his pioneering list as number XXXV. Entry was first gained by Gaston Maspero, who examined its substructure in 1881. He had recently discovered a set of texts in the pyramids of Pepi I and Merenre I. Those same texts were discovered in Unas's tomb, making this their earliest known appearance. From 1899 to 1901, the architect and Egyptologist Alessandro Barsanti conducted the first systematic investigation of the pyramid site, succeeding in excavating part of the mortuary temple, as well as a series of tombs from the Second Dynasty and the Late Period. Later excavations by Cecil Mallaby Firth, from 1929 until his death in 1931, followed by those of the architect Jean-Philippe Lauer from 1936 to 1939, were conducted with little success. The archaeologists Selim Hassan, Muhammed Zakaria Goneim and A. H. Hussein mainly focused on the causeway leading to the pyramid while conducting their investigations from 1937 to 1949. Hussein discovered a pair of limestone-lined boat pits at the upper end of the causeway. In the 1970s, Ahmad Moussa excavated the lower half of the causeway and the valley temple. Moussa and another archaeologist, Audran Labrousse, conducted an architectural survey of the valley temple from 1971 to 1981. The pyramids of Unas, Teti, Pepi I and Merenre were the subjects of a major architectural and epigraphic project in Saqqara, led by Jean Leclant. From 1999 until 2001, the Supreme Council of Antiquities conducted a major restoration and reconstruction project on the valley temple. The three entrances and ramps were restored, and a low limestone wall built to demarcate the temple's plan.

== Mortuary complex ==
=== Layout ===
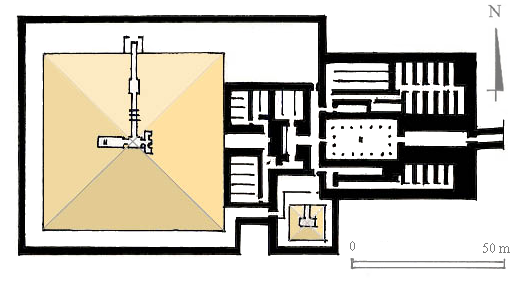
Layout of Unas's complex

Unas's complex is situated between the pyramid of Sekhemkhet and the south-west corner of the pyramid complex of Djoser. It is in symmetry with the pyramid of Userkaf situated at the north-east corner, in Saqqara. Old Kingdom mortuary complexes consist of five essential components: (1) a valley temple; (2) a causeway; (3) a mortuary temple; (4) a cult pyramid; and (5) the main pyramid. Unas's monument has all of these elements: the main pyramid, constructed six steps high from limestone blocks; a valley temple situated in a natural harbour at the mouth of a wadi; a causeway constructed using the same wadi as a path; a mortuary temple similar in layout to that of Unas's predecessor, Djedkare Isesi's, and a cult pyramid in the south of the mortuary temple. The pyramid, mortuary temple and cult pyramid were enclosed by a 7 m (23 ft; 13 cu) tall perimeter wall. The perimeter wall from the north-east to north-west corner is about 86 m (282 ft; 164 cu) long, and stretches 76 m (249 ft; 145 cu) from north to south.

=== Main pyramid ===
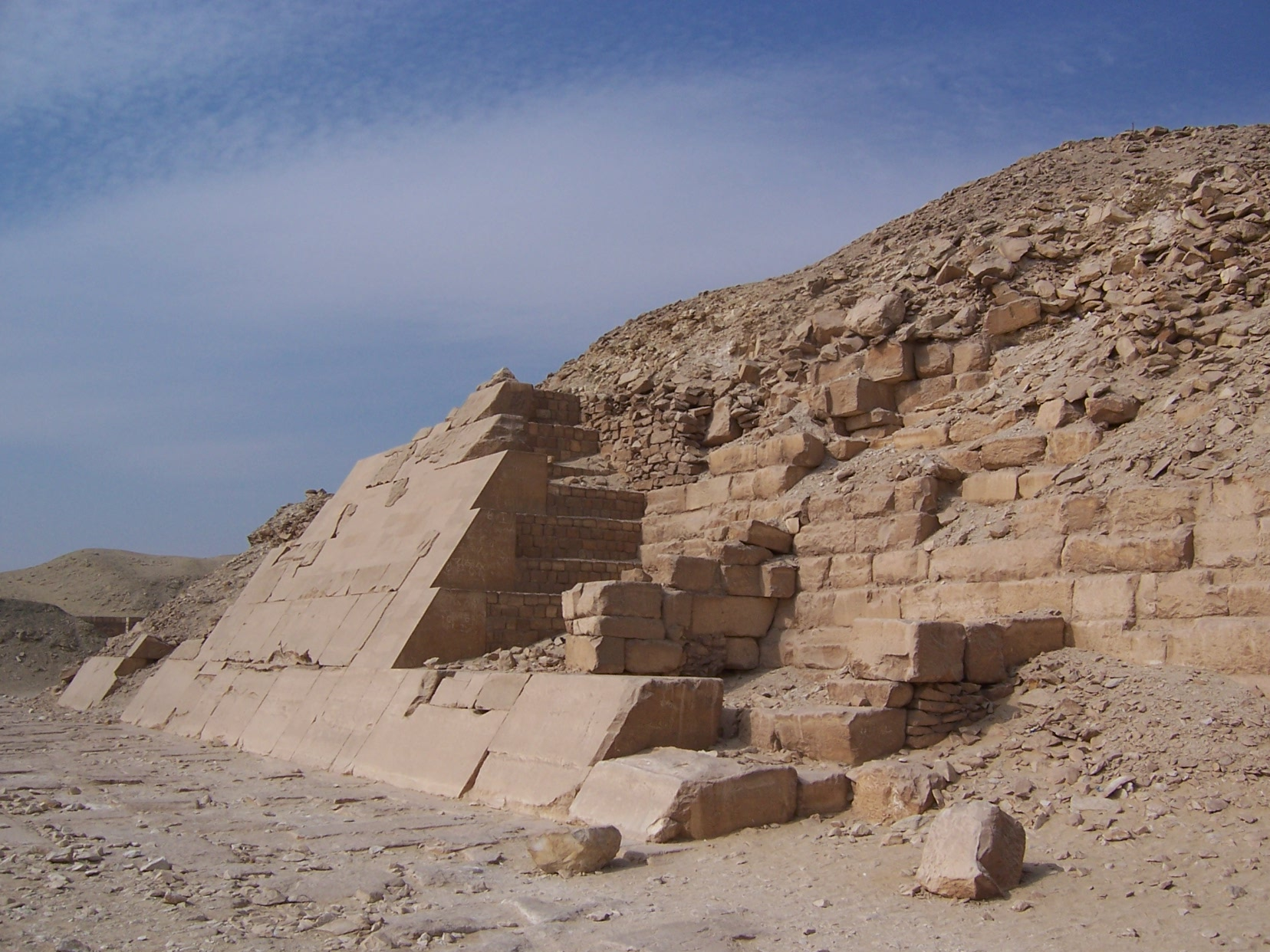
Remains of the outer casing on Unas's pyramid

Though Unas's reign lasted for around thirty to thirty-three years, his pyramid was the smallest built in the Old Kingdom. Time constraints cannot be considered a factor explaining the small size, and it is more likely that resource accessibility constrained the project. The monument's size was also inhibited due to the extensive quarrying necessary to increase the size of the pyramid. Unas chose to avoid that additional burden and instead kept his pyramid small.

The core of the pyramid was built six steps high, constructed with roughly dressed limestone blocks which decreased in size in each step. The construction material for the core would, ideally, have been locally sourced. This was then encased with fine white limestone blocks quarried from Tura. Some of the casing on the lowest steps has remained intact. The pyramid had a base length of 57.75 m (189.5 ft; 110.21 cu) converging towards the apex at an angle of approximately 56°, giving it a height of 43 metres (141 ft; 82 cu) on completion. The pyramid had a total volume of 47,390 m^{3} (61,980 cu yd). The pyramid was smooth-sided. The pyramid has since been ruined, as have all others of the Fifth Dynasty, a result of its poor construction and materials. The pyramids of the Fifth Dynasty were further systematically dismantled during the New Kingdom to be reused in the construction of new tombs.

Unas abandoned the practice of building pyramids for his consorts; instead, Khenut and Nebet were buried in a double mastaba north-east of the main pyramid. Each queen was accorded separate rooms and an individual entrance, though the layout of the tombs is identical. Khenut owned the western half, and Nebet owned the eastern half. Their chambers were extensively decorated. The chapel for Nebet's mastaba contains four recesses. One bears a cartouche of Unas's name, indicating that it may have contained a statue of the king, whereas the others contained statues of the queen. Directly north of the mastaba were the tombs for Unas's son Unasankh and daughter Iput. Another daughter, Hemetre, was buried in a tomb west of Djoser's complex.

=== Substructure ===
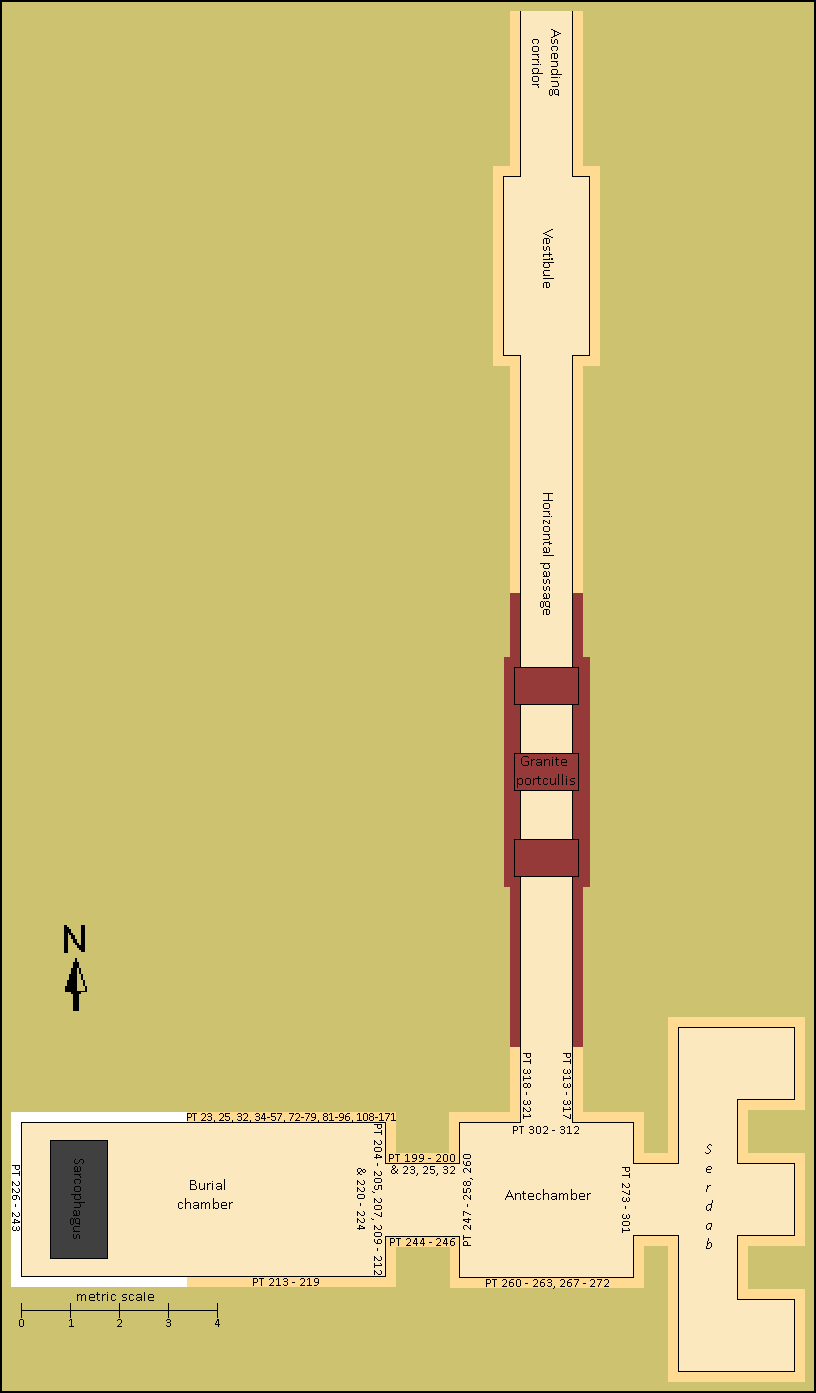
Layout of Unas's substructure. Materials colour-coded: light orange = fine white limestone; red = red granite; white = white alabaster; grey = greywacke.

A small chapel, called the "north chapel" or "entrance chapel", was situated adjacent to the pyramid's north face. It consisted of a single room, with an altar and a stela bearing the hieroglyph for "offering table". Only trace elements of the chapel remain. These chapels had a false door and a decoration scheme similar to the offering hall, which the archaeologist Dieter Arnold suggests indicates that the chapel was a "miniature offering chapel".

The entrance into the substructure of the pyramid lay under the chapel's pavement. The substructure of the pyramid is similar to that of Unas's predecessor, Djedkare Isesi. The entry leads into a 14.35 m (47.1 ft) long vertically sloping corridor inclined at 22° that leads to a vestibule at its bottom. The vestibule is 2.47 m (8.1 ft) long and 2.08 m (6.8 ft) wide. From the vestibule, a 14.10 m (46.3 ft) long horizontal passage follows a level path to the antechamber and is guarded by three granite slab portcullises in succession. The passage ends at an antechamber, a room measuring 3.75 m (12.3 ft) by 3.08 m (10.1 ft), located under the centre axis of the pyramid. To the east, a doorway leads to a room – called the serdab – with three recesses. (Note: The function of the serdab is unclear. Joachim Spiegel considered the room to represent the day sky. Nicolas Grimal postulates that these held statues of the deceased. Mark Lehner adds that the niches could have been used for storing provisions of the cult; a symbolic transfer of offerings presented at the offering hall's false door into the subterranean chambers. Leclant disputes the royal statue hypothesis, proffering instead their use as storage compartments for funerary materials. Bernard Mathieu posits that the serdab represents the "Demeure d'Osiris" (residence of Osiris), where the ruler has to descend below the horizon before resuming their ascent to the northern sky. James Allen notes that it may relate to the tripartite "Tomb of Horus", featured in the Amduat, containing Horus's dismembered body after he is slain by Seth. The three recesses thus contained the "human head, falcon wings, and feline rear" of Horus.) The serdab measures 6.75 m (22.1 ft) wide and 2 m (6.6 ft) deep. To the west lay the burial chamber, a room measuring 7.3 m (24 ft) by 3.08 m (10.1 ft), containing the ruler's sarcophagus. The roof of both the antechamber and burial chamber were gabled, in a similar fashion to earlier pyramids of the era.

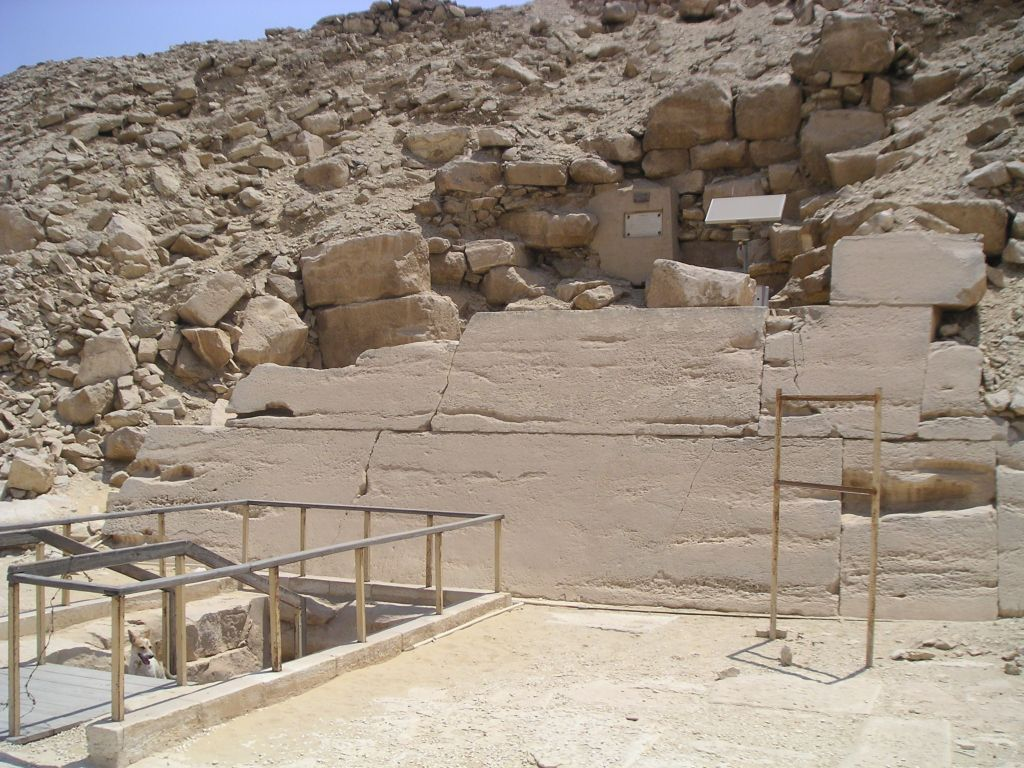
Modern entrance to the pyramid substructures (bottom left)

Near the burial chamber's west wall sat Unas's coffin, made from greywacke rather than basalt as was originally presumed. The coffin was undamaged, but its contents had been robbed. A canopic chest had once been buried at the foot of the south-east corner of the coffin. Traces of the burial are fragmentary; all that remain are portions of a mummy, including its right arm, skull and shinbone, as well as the wooden handles of two knives used during the opening of the mouth ceremony. The mummy remains have been displayed in the Egyptian Museum of Cairo.

One of the walls of the burial chamber with the hidden figure of Khufu visible under certain lighting.

The walls of the chambers were lined with Tura limestone, while those surrounding Unas's sarcophagus were sheathed in white alabaster incised and painted to represent the doors of the royal palace facade, complementing the eastern passage. Taken as symbolically functional, these allowed the king to depart the tomb in any direction. The walls appear to contain blocks reused from one of Khufu's constructions, possibly his pyramid complex at Giza, as an earlier scene of the king (identified by his Horus name Medjedu) fishing with a harpoon was discovered beneath those carved for Unas, and can be seen under specific lighting angles and in dim or dark conditions.

The ceiling of the burial chamber was painted blue with gold stars to resemble the night sky. The ceiling of the antechamber and corridor were similarly painted. Whereas the stars in the antechamber and the burial chamber pointed northward, the stars in the corridor pointed towards the zenith. The remaining walls of the burial chamber, antechamber, and parts of the corridor were inscribed with a series of vertically written texts, chiselled in bas-relief and painted blue.

==== Pyramid Texts of Unas ====
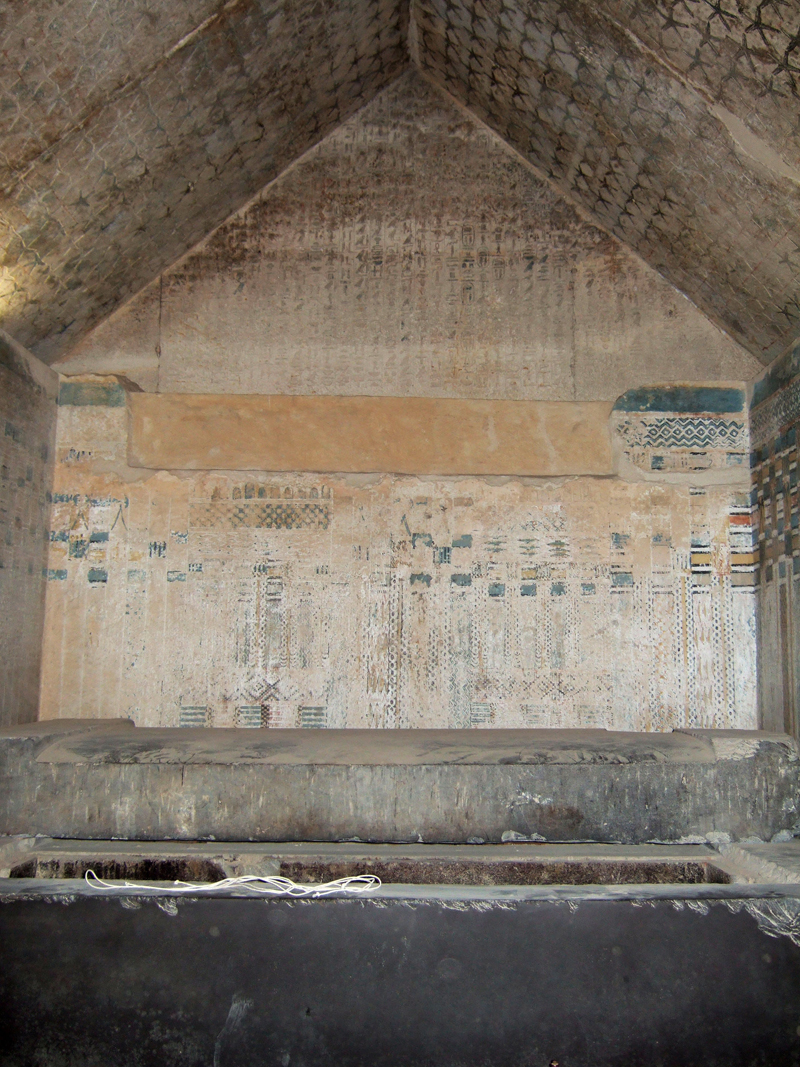
The burial chamber with protective spells filling the west gable, protecting the sarcophagus and its contents below.

The inscriptions, known as the Pyramid Texts, were the central innovation of Unas's pyramid, on whose subterranean walls they were first etched. The Pyramid Texts are the oldest large corpus of religious writing known from ancient Egypt. A total of 283 such spells, out of at least 1,000 known and an indeterminate number of unknown ones, appear in Unas's pyramid. The spells are the smallest and best-preserved collection of Pyramid Texts known from the Old Kingdom. Though they first appeared in Unas's pyramid, many of the texts are significantly older. (Note: Many of the texts of the offering ritual share commonalities with an "offering list" that has been discovered in other Fifth Dynasty tombs. The earliest intact example has been sourced from the non-royal tomb of Debeheni, apparently endowed to him by Menkaure of the Fourth Dynasty. Precursor lists have been dated to non-royal tombs built during Khufu's reign, two centuries before Unas's reign. Fragments of the list have been discovered in the mortuary temples of the Fifth Dynasty rulers Sahure, Neferirkare Kakai, and Nyuserre.) The texts subsequently appeared in the pyramids of the kings and queens of the Sixth to Eighth Dynasties, until the end of the Old Kingdom. With the exception of a single spell, copies of Unas's texts appeared throughout the Middle Kingdom and later, including a near complete replica of the texts in the tomb of Senwosretankh at El-Lisht.

Ancient Egyptian belief held that the individual consisted of three basic parts; the body, the ka, and the ba. When the person died, the ka would separate from the body and return to the gods from where it had come, while the ba remained with the body. The body of the individual, interred in the burial chamber, never physically left; but the ba, awakened, released itself from the body and began its journey toward new life. Significant to this journey was the Akhet: the horizon, a junction between the earth, the sky, and the Duat. To ancient Egyptians, the Akhet was the place from where the sun rose, and so symbolised a place of birth or resurrection. In the texts, the king is called upon to transform into an akh in the Akhet. The akh, literally "effective being", was the resurrected form of the deceased, attained through individual action and ritual performance. If the deceased failed to complete the transformation, they became mutu, that is "the dead". The function of the texts, in congruence with all funerary literature, was to enable the reunion of the ruler's ba and ka leading to the transformation into an akh, and to secure eternal life among the gods in the sky.

The writings on the west gable in Unas's burial chamber consist of spells that protect the sarcophagus and mummy within. The north and south walls of the chamber are dedicated to the offering and resurrection rituals respectively, and the east wall contains texts asserting the king's control over his sustenance in the form of a response to the offering ritual. The offering ritual texts continue onto the north and south walls of the passageway splitting the resurrection ritual which concludes on the south wall. In the rituals of the burial chamber, the king is identified both as himself and as the god Osiris, being addressed as the Osiris Unas. The king is also identified with other deities, occasionally several, alongside Osiris in other texts. The Egyptologist James Allen identifies the last piece of ritual text on the west gable of the antechamber:

Your son Horus has acted for you.
The great ones will shake, having seen the knife in your arm as you emerge from the Duat.
Greetings, experienced one! Geb has created you, the Ennead has given you birth.
Horus has become content about his father, Atum has become content about his years, the eastern and western gods have become content about the great thing that has happened in his embrace – the god's birth.
It is Unis: Unis, see! It is Unis: Unis, look! It is Unis: hear! It is Unis: Unis, exist! It is Unis: Unis, raise yourself from your side!
Do my command, you who hate sleep but were made slack. Stand up, you in Nedit. Your good bread has been made in Pe; receive your control of Heliopolis.
It is Horus (who speaks), having been commanded to act for his father.
The storm-lord, the one with spittle in his vicinity, Seth – he will bear you: he is the one who will bear Atum.

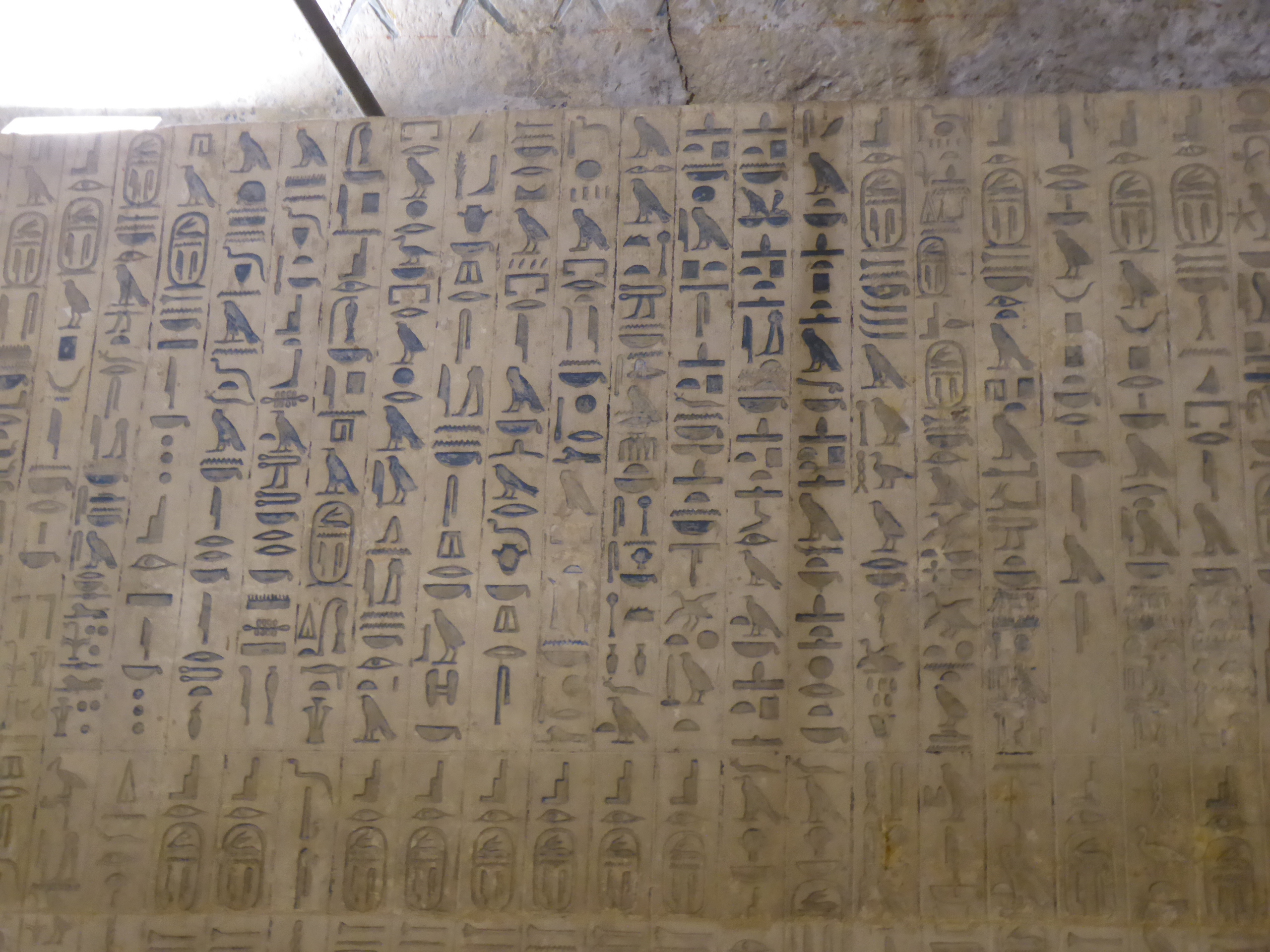
Pyramid Texts belonging to the Offering Ritual which appear on the north wall of Unas's burial chamber

The antechamber and corridor were inscribed primarily with personal texts, although the serdab remained uninscribed. The west, north and south walls of the antechamber contain texts whose primary concern is the transition from the human realm to the next, and with the king's ascent to the sky. The east wall held a second set of protective spells, starting with Utterances 273 and 274, also known as the "Cannibal Hymn". In the hymn, Unas consumes the gods to absorb their power for his resurrection. The Egyptologist Toby Wilkinson identifies the hymn as a mythologizing of the "butchery ritual" in which a bull is sacrificed.

A god who lives on his fathers,
who feeds on his mothers...
Unas is the bull of heaven
Who rages in his heart,
Who lives on the being of every god,
Who eats their entrails
When they come, their bodies full of magic
From the Isle of Flame...

However, the same spells (PT 269) also declare:

May I be with you, you gods;
May you be with me, you gods.
May I live with you, you gods;
May you live with me, you gods.
I love you, you gods;
May you love me, you gods.

The Cannibal Hymn later reappeared in the Coffin Texts as Spell 573. It was dropped by the time the Book of the Dead was being copied.

The southern section of the walls of the corridor contain texts (Note: In Unas's pyramid, only the south sections of the horizontal passage was inscribed. Teti's pyramid received the same treatment, though the pyramids of Merenre and Pepi II had writings throughout the entire horizontal passage and the vestibule with the three granite portcullises, and Pepi I's pyramid also had writings on a section of the ascending corridor as well.) that focus primarily on the resurrection and ascension of the deceased. The mere presence of the spells (Note: The symbols were strongly believed to have powerful magic imbued within; so much so that hieroglyphic symbols representing dangerous animals, such as a snake or lion, were intentionally damaged after being inscribed in order to prevent them from corporealising and threatening the well being of the king in his chambers.) within the tomb were believed to have efficacy, thus protecting the king even if the funerary cult ceased to function. (Note: A motivator for the regular performance of the cult was the temporary nature of oration. By inscribing the texts, the rites gained permanence. Even as an akh, the deceased required the attention of the living who sustained them through rituals and offerings.)

Parts of the corpus of Pyramid Texts were passed down into the Coffin Texts, an expanded set of new texts written on non-royal tombs of the Middle Kingdom, some retaining Old Kingdom grammatical conventions and with many formulations of the Pyramid Texts recurring. The transition to the Coffin Texts was begun in the reign of Pepi I and completed by the Middle Kingdom. The Coffin Texts formed the basis for the Book of the Dead in the New Kingdom and Late Period. The texts would resurface in tombs and on papyri for two millennia, finally disappearing around the time that Christianity was adopted.

=== Valley temple ===
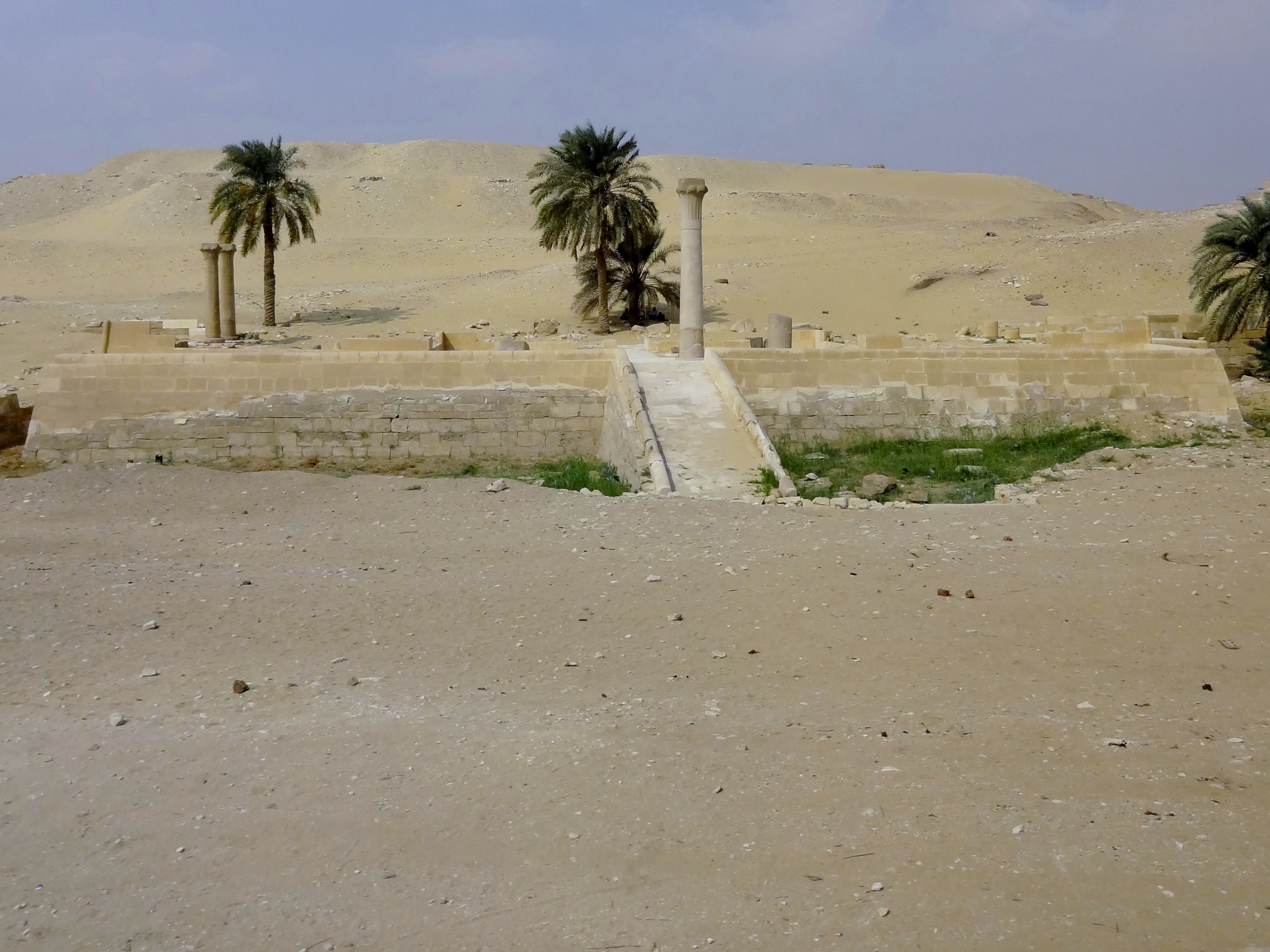
Valley temple belonging to Unas's pyramid complex

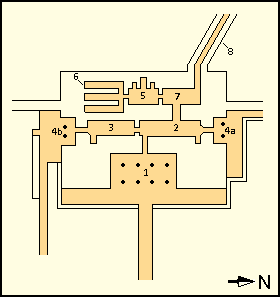
Layout of Unas's valley temple. In order: (1) Colonnaded entrance court; (2) Entrance hall; (3) South hall; (4a and b) Secondary entrances; (5) Main cult hall; (6) Storerooms; (7) Passage leading to (8) the Causeway.

Unas's valley temple is situated in a harbour that naturally forms at the point where the mouth of a wadi meets the lake. The same wadi was used as a path for the causeway. The temple sits between those of Nyuserre Ini and Pepi II. Despite a complex plan, the temple did not contain any significant innovations. It was richly decorated – in a fashion similar to the causeway and mortuary temple – and the surviving palm granite columns that stood at the entrance into the temple evidence their high quality craftsmanship.

The main entrance into the temple was on the east side, consisting of a portico with eight granite palm columns arranged into two rows. A narrow westward corridor led from the entry into a rectangular north–south oriented hall. A second hall was to the south. Two secondary entrances into the halls were built on the north and south sides. Each had a portico with two columns. These were approached by narrow ramps. West of the two halls was the main cult hall. It had a second chamber with three storerooms to the south and a passageway leading to the causeway to the north-west.

=== Causeway ===
The causeway connecting the valley temple to the mortuary temple of Unas's pyramid complex was constructed along the path provided by a natural wadi. The Egyptologist Iorwerth Edwards estimates the walls to be 4 m (13 ft) high, and 2.04 m (6 ft 8 in) thick. The passageway was about 2.65 m (8 ft 8 in) wide. It had a roof constructed from slabs 0.45 m (1 ft 6 in) thick projecting from each wall toward the centre. The causeway, at between 720 m (2,360 ft) and 750 m (2,460 ft) long, was among the longest constructed for any pyramid, comparable to the causeway of Khufu's pyramid. The causeway is also the best preserved of any from the Old Kingdom. Construction of the causeway was complicated and required negotiating uneven terrain and older buildings which were torn down and their stones appropriated as underlay. The causeway was built with two turns, rather than in a straight line. Around 250 m (820 ft) worth of Djoser's causeway was used to provide embankments for Unas's causeway and to plug gaps between it and the wadi. South of the uppermost bend of the causeway were two 45 m (148 ft) long boat pits of white limestone, which might originally have housed wooden boats with curved keels representing the day and night vessels of Ra, the sun god. The boats lay side by side in an east–west orientation.

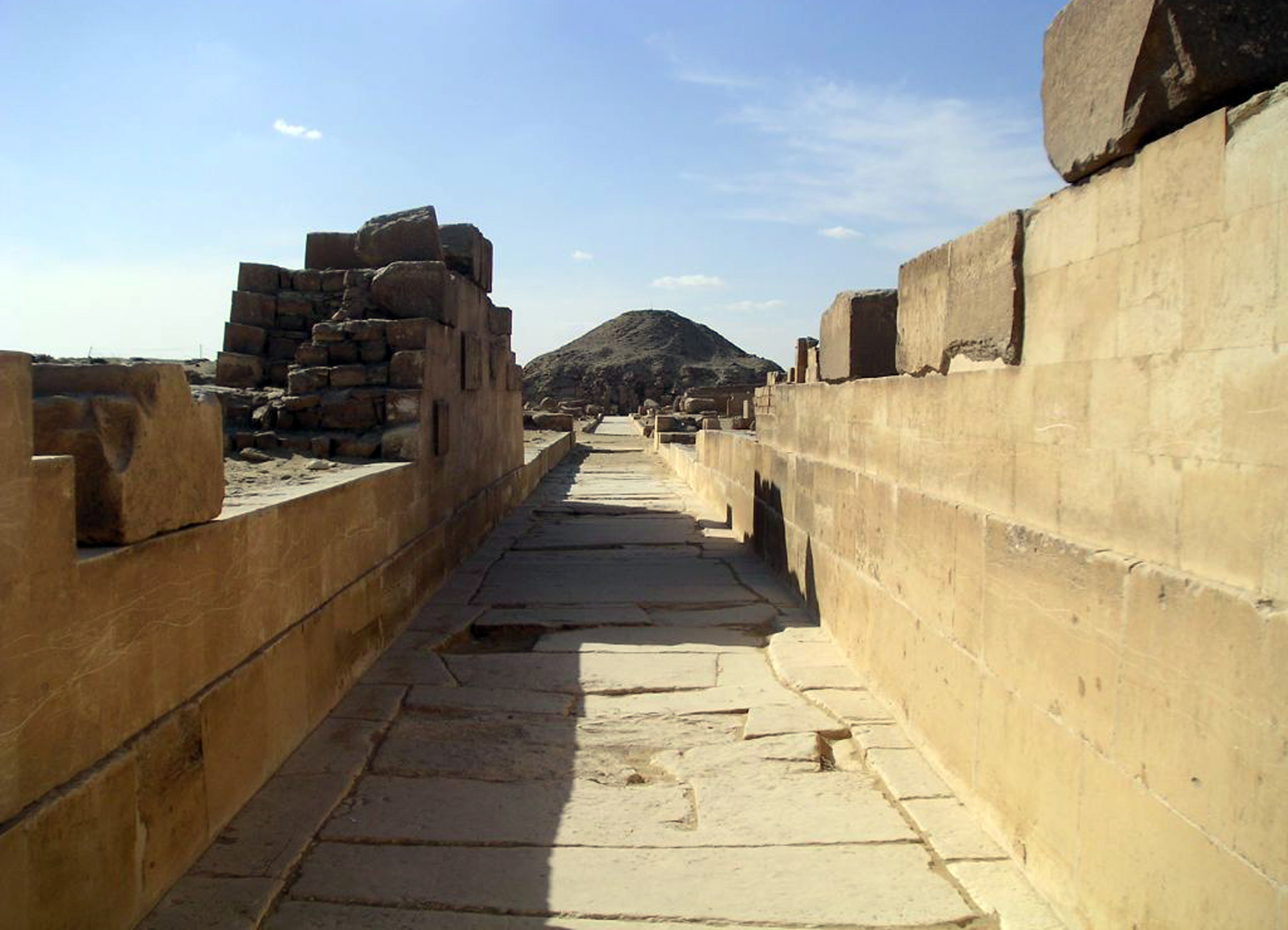
Causeway leading to the pyramid of Unas

Tombs in the path of the causeway were built over, preserving their decorations, but not their contents, indicating that the tombs had been robbed either before or during the causeway's construction. Two large royal tombs, dating to the Second Dynasty, are among those that lie beneath the causeway. The western gallery tomb contains seals bearing the names of Hotepsekhemwy and Nebra, and the eastern gallery tomb contains numerous seals inscribed with the name of Ninetjer indicating probable ownership. The superstructures of the tombs were demolished, allowing the mortuary temple and upper end of the causeway to be built over the top of them.

The interior walls of the causeway were highly decorated with painted bas-reliefs, but records of these are fragmentary. The remnants depict a variety of scenes including the hunting of wild animals, the conducting of harvests, scenes from the markets, craftsmen working copper and gold, a fleet returning from Byblos, boats transporting columns from Aswan to the construction site, battles with enemies and nomadic tribes, the transport of prisoners, lines of people bearing offerings, and a procession of representatives from the nomes of Egypt. A slit was left in a section of the causeway roofing, allowing light to enter illuminating the brightly painted decorations on the walls. The archaeologist Peter Clayton notes that these depictions were more akin to those found in the mastabas of nobles.

The Egyptologist Miroslav Verner highlights one particular scene from the causeway depicting famished desert nomads. The scene had been used as "unique proof" that the living standards of desert dwellers had declined during Unas's reign as a result of climatic changes in the middle of the third millennium B.C. The discovery of a similar relief painting on the blocks of Sahure's causeway casts doubt on this hypothesis. Verner contends that the nomads may have been brought in to demonstrate the hardships faced by pyramid builders bringing in higher quality stone from remote mountain areas. Grimal suggested that this scene foreshadowed the nationwide famine that seems to have struck Egypt (Note: The issue of famines and economic crises is a hallmark of the First Intermediate Period of Egypt. A series of failures of the Nile flood in various years, a result of climate change, is often blamed for the collapse of the Old Kingdom. Evidence in the form of biographical testimonies, such as the inscriptions of Ankhtifi in his tomb at El-Mo'alla, attesting to the famines are numerous, but somewhat questionable. Climatic change bringing drier seasons appears to have started during the Old Kingdom, and archaeological observations at Elephantine suggests that flooding seasons were better, not worse, during the First Intermediate Period. Crises were socially significant during the period, and gave a basis for the legitimacy of rulers' power. Rulers positioned themselves as caring for the whole of their society, including the weak and unfortunate, ensuring their right to authority and respect.) at the onset of the First Intermediate Period. According to Allen et al., the most widely accepted explanation for the scene is that it was meant to illustrate the generosity of the sovereign in aiding famished populations.

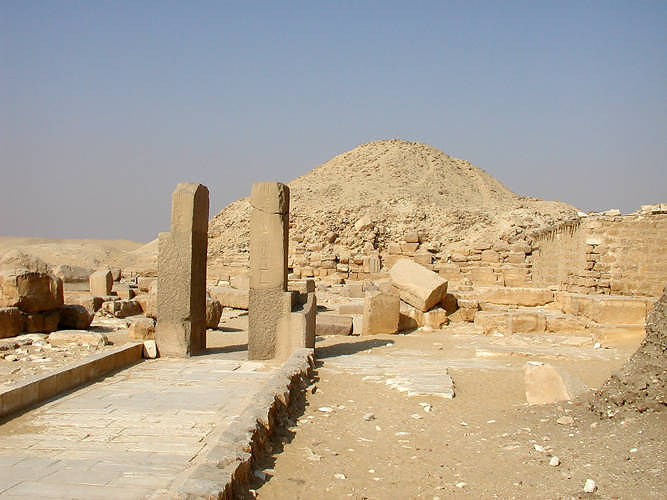
End of Unas's causeway facing the mortuary temple

A collection of tombs were found north of the causeway. The tomb of Akhethetep, a vizier, was discovered by a team led by Christiane Ziegler. The other mastabas belong to the viziers Ihy, Iy–nofert, Ny-ankh-ba and Mehu. The tombs are conjectured to belong to Unas's viziers, with the exception of Mehu's tomb, which is associated with Pepi I. Another tomb, belonging to Unas-ankh, son of Unas, separates the tombs of Ihy and Iy-nofert. It may be dated late into Unas's reign.

Ahmed Moussa discovered the rock-cut tombs of Nefer and Ka-hay – court singers during Menkauhor's reign – south of Unas's causeway, containing nine burials along with an extremely well preserved mummy found in a coffin in a shaft under the east wall of the chapel. The Chief Inspector at Saqqara, Mounir Basta, discovered another rock-cut tomb just south of the causeway in 1964, later excavated by Ahmed Moussa. The tombs belonged to two palace officials – manicurists – living during the reigns of Nyuserre Ini and Menkauhor, in the Fifth Dynasty, named Ni-ankh-khnum and Khnum-hotep. A highly decorated chapel for the tomb was discovered the following year. The chapel was located inside a unique stone mastaba that was connected to the tombs through an undecorated open court.

=== Mortuary temple ===
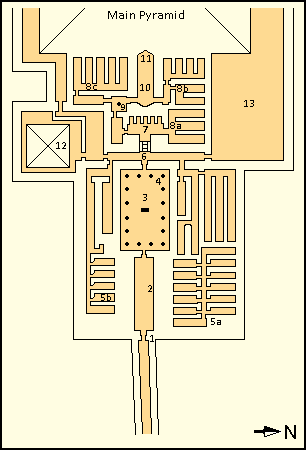
Layout of Unas's mortuary temple. In order: (1) Granite doorway built by Teti; (2) Entrance hall with (5a and b) storerooms to the north and south; (3) Courtyard with (4) eighteen granite columns; (6) Transverse corridor; (7) Chapel with five statue niches; (8a, b and c) Storerooms of the inner temple; (9) Antichambre carrée with central column; (10) Offering hall with (11) false door bearing a protective inscription; (12) Cult pyramid; and (13) Courtyard surrounding the pyramid complex.

The mortuary temple in Unas's pyramid complex has a layout comparable to his predecessor, Djedkare Isesi's, with one notable exception. A pink granite doorway separates the end of the causeway from the entrance hall. It bears the names and titles of Teti, Unas's successor, indicating that he must have had the doorway constructed following Unas's death. The entrance hall had a vaulted ceiling, and a floor paved with alabaster. The walls in the room were decorated with relief paintings that depicted the making of offerings. The entrance hall terminates in an open columned courtyard, with eighteen – two more columns than in Djedkare Isesi's complex – pink granite palm columns supporting the roof of an ambulatory. Some of the columns were reused centuries later in buildings in Tanis, the capital of Egypt during the Twenty First and Twenty Second Dynasties. Other columns have been displayed in the British Museum, and in the Louvre. Relief decorations that were formerly in the courtyard have also been reused in later projects, as shown by the presence of reliefs of Unas in Amenemhat I's pyramid complex in El-Lisht.

Palmiform column from Unas's mortuary temple on display in the Louvre

North and south of the entrance hall and columned courtyard were storerooms. These were stocked regularly with offering items for the royal funerary cult, which had expanded influence (Note: By the Fifth Dynasty, the religious institution had established itself as the dominant force in society; a trend of growth in the bureaucracy and the priesthood, and a decline in the pharaoh's power had been established during Neferirkare Kakai's reign and only intensified during Unas's. The prioritization of cult activities received its expression in the expansive storeroom complexes that became a feature of pyramid temples beginning with Sahure's reign, and the space they occupied increased in a linear fashion from Neferirkare Kakai's reign onwards.) in the Fifth Dynasty. Their irregular placement resulted in the northern storerooms being twice as numerous as the southern. The rooms were used for burials in the Late Period, as noted by the presence of large shaft tombs. At the far end of the courtyard was a transverse corridor creating an intersection between the columned courtyard at its east and inner temple to its west, with a cult pyramid to the south, and a larger courtyard surrounding the pyramid to the north.

The inner temple is accessed by a small staircase leading into a ruined chapel with five statue niches. The chapel and offering hall were surrounded by storerooms; as elsewhere in the temple, there were more storerooms to the north than south. The antichambre carrée – a square antechamber – separated the chapel from the offering hall. The room measures 4.2 m (14 ft; 8.0 cu) on each side, making it the smallest such chamber from the Old Kingdom, but has been largely destroyed. It was originally entered through a door on its eastern side, and contained two additional doors leading to the offering hall and storeroom. The room contained a single column made of quartzite – fragments of which have been found in the south-west part of the temple – quarried from the Gabel Ahmar stone quarry near Heliopolis. Quartzite, being a particularly hard stone – a 7 on the Mohs hardness scale – was not typically used in architectural projects, but was used sparingly as a building material at some Old Kingdom sites in Saqqara. The hard stone is associated with the sun cult, a natural development caused by the coloration of the material being sun-like. Remnants of a granite false door bearing an inscription concerning the souls of the residents of Nekhen and Buto marks what little of the offering hall has been preserved. A block from the door has been displayed in the Egyptian Museum in Cairo.

=== Cult pyramid ===
The purpose of the cult pyramid remains unclear. It had a burial chamber but was not used for burials, and instead appears to have been a purely symbolic structure. It may have hosted the pharaoh's ka, or a miniature statue of the king. It may have been used for ritual performances centring around the burial and resurrection of the ka spirit during the Sed festival.

The cult pyramid in Unas's complex has identifiable remains, but has otherwise been destroyed. The preserved elements suggest that it had a base length of 11.5 m (38 ft; 22 cu), a fifth of that of the main pyramid. The pyramid's covering slabs were inclined at 69°. This was typical for cult pyramids which had a 2:1 ratio-ed slope, and thus a height equal to the length of the base, i.e. 11.5 m (38 ft; 22 cu). A small channel was dug in front of the pyramid entrance, perhaps to prevent run-off from entering the pyramid. The first slabs of the descending corridor are declined at 30.5°. The pit measures 5.15 m (17 ft; 10 cu) north-south and 8.15 m (27 ft; 16 cu) east-west. The burial chamber was cut 2.03 m (7 ft; 4 cu) deep into the rock, sits 2.12 m (7 ft; 4 cu) beneath the pavement and measures 5 m (16 ft; 10 cu) by 2.5 m (8 ft; 5 cu).

The "great enclosure" (Note: translated from the French: "la grande enceinte") of the main pyramid and inner temple has an identifiable anomaly. 4 m (13 ft; 8 cu) from the cult pyramid's west face the wall abruptly turns to the north before receding for 12 m (39 ft; 23 cu) toward the main pyramid. It stops 2.6 m (8.5 ft; 5.0 cu) from the main pyramid and turns once more back onto its original alignment. The only explanation for this is the presence of the Second Dynasty Hotepsekhemwy's large tomb which spans the width of the whole temple and crosses directly under the recess. The architects of the pyramid appear to have preferred for the enclosure wall to run over the tomb's passageway, rather than over the top of the subterranean gallery. The cult pyramid has its own secondary enclosure that runs along the north face of the pyramid and half of its west face. This secondary wall was about 1.04 m (3 ft; 2 cu) thick, and had a double-door 0.8 m (2.6 ft) thick built close to its start.

== Later history ==
Evidence suggests that Unas's funerary cult survived through the First Intermediate Period and into the Middle Kingdom, an indication that Unas retained prestige long after his death. Two independent pieces of evidence corroborate the existence of the cult in the Middle Kingdom: 1) A stela dated to the Twelfth Dynasty bearing the name Unasemsaf (Note: transl. Wnỉs-m-zʒ.f) and 2) A statue of a Memphite official, Sermaat, (Note: transl. Sr-mʒꜥt) from the Twelfth or Thirteenth Dynasty, with an inscription invoking Unas's name. The Egyptologist Jaromír Málek contends that the evidence only suggests a theoretical revival of the cult, a result of the valley temple serving as a useful entry path into the Saqqara necropolis, but not its persistence from the Old Kingdom. Despite renewed interest in the Old Kingdom rulers at the time, their funerary complexes, including Unas's, were partially reused in the construction of Amenemhat I's and Senusret I's pyramid complexes at El-Lisht. One block used in Amenemhat's complex has been positively identified as originating from Unas's complex, likely taken from the causeway, on the basis of inscriptions containing his name appearing upon it. Several other blocks have their origins speculatively assigned to Unas's complex as well.

The Saqqara plateau witnessed a new era of tomb building in the New Kingdom. Starting with the reign of Thutmose III in the Eighteenth Dynasty and up until possibly the Twentieth Dynasty, Saqqara was used as a site for the tombs of private individuals. The largest concentrations of tombs from the period are found in a large area south of Unas's causeway. This area came to prominent use around the time of Tutankhamun. Unas's pyramid underwent restorative work in the New Kingdom. In the Nineteenth Dynasty, Khaemweset, High Priest of Memphis and son of Ramesses II, had an inscription carved onto a block on the pyramid's south side commemorating his restoration work.

Late Period monuments, colloquially called the "Persian tombs", thought to date to the reign of Amasis II, were discovered near the causeway. These include tombs built for Tjannehebu, Overseer of the Royal Navy; Psamtik, the Chief Physician; and Peteniese, Overseer of Confidential Documents. The Egyptologist John Ray explains that the site was chosen because it was readily accessible from both Memphis and the Nile Valley. Traces of Phoenician and Aramaic burials have been reported in the area directly south of Unas's causeway.

== See also ==
- List of Egyptian pyramids
- List of megalithic sites

== Sources ==
- Allen, James (2001). "Pyramid Texts". In Redford, Donald B. (ed.). The Oxford Encyclopedia of Ancient Egypt, Volume 3. Oxford: Oxford University Press. pp. 95–98. ISBN 978-0-19-510234-5.
- Allen, James (2005). Der Manuelian, Peter (ed.). The Ancient Egyptian Pyramid Texts. Writings from the Ancient World, Number 23. Atlanta: Society of Biblical Literature. ISBN 978-1-58983-182-7.
- Allen, James; Allen, Susan; Anderson, Julie; et al. (1999). Egyptian Art in the Age of the Pyramids. New York: The Metropolitan Museum of Art. ISBN 978-0-8109-6543-0. OCLC 41431623.
- Altenmüller, Hartwig (2001). "Old Kingdom: Fifth Dynasty". In Redford, Donald B. (ed.). The Oxford Encyclopedia of Ancient Egypt, Volume 2. Oxford: Oxford University Press. pp. 597–601. ISBN 978-0-19-510234-5.
- Altenmüller, Hartwig (2002). "Funerary Boats and Boat Pits of the Old Kingdom" (PDF). In Coppens, Filip (ed.). Abusir and Saqqara in the Year 2001. Vol. 70. Prague: Academy of Sciences of the Czech Republic, Oriental Institute. pp. 269–290. ISSN 0044-8699.
- Arnold, Dieter (2003). The Encyclopaedia of Ancient Egyptian Architecture. London: I.B. Tauris. ISBN 978-1-86064-465-8.
- Arnold, Dieter (2005). "Royal cult complexes of the Old and Middle Kingdoms". In Schafer, Byron E. (ed.). Temples of Ancient Egypt. London & New York: I.B. Taurus. pp. 31–86. ISBN 978-1-85043-945-5.
- Bard, Kathryn (2015). An introduction to the archaeology of ancient Egypt. Hoboken, NJ: John Wiley and Sons, Inc. ISBN 978-0-470-67336-2.
- Bárta, Miroslav (2005). "Location of the Old Kingdom Pyramids in Egypt". Cambridge Archaeological Journal. 15 (2): 177–191. doi:10.1017/s0959774305000090. S2CID 161629772.
- Billing, Nils (2018). The Performative Structure: Ritualizing the Pyramid of Pepy I. Leiden & Boston: Brill. ISBN 978-90-04-37237-5.
- Budge, Ernest Alfred Wallis (1920). An Egyptian Hieroglyphic Dictionary: With an index of English words, King List and Geographical List with Indexes, List of Hieroglyphic Characters, Coptic and Semitic Alphabets, etc. Vol. 1. London: J. Murray. OCLC 697736910.
- Chauvet, Violaine (2001). "Saqqara". In Redford, Donald B. (ed.). The Oxford Encyclopedia of Ancient Egypt, Volume 3. Oxford: Oxford University Press. pp. 176–179. ISBN 978-0-19-510234-5.
- Clayton, Peter A. (1994). Chronicle of the Pharaohs. London: Thames & Hudson. ISBN 978-0-500-05074-3.
- Ćwiek, Andrzej (2003). Relief Decoration in the Royal Funerary Complexes of the Old Kingdom: Studies in the Development, Scene Content and Iconography (PhD). Supervised by Karol Myśliwiec. Warsaw: Institute of Archeology, Warsaw University. OCLC 315589023.
- Dodson, Aidan; Hilton, Dyan (2004). The Complete Royal Families of Ancient Egypt. London: Thames & Hudson. ISBN 978-0-500-05128-3.
- Dodson, Aidan (2016). The Royal Tombs of Ancient Egypt. Barnsley, South Yorkshire: Pen & Sword Archaeology. ISBN 978-1-47382-159-0.
- Edel, Elmar (2013) [1980]. Hieroglyphische Inschriften des Alten Reiches (in German). Wiesbaden: Springer Fachmedien Wiesbaden GmBH. ISBN 978-3-531-05081-2.
- Edwards, Iorwerth (1993) [1947]. The pyramids of Egypt. London: Penguin Books. ISBN 978-0140136340. OCLC 473229011.
- Eyre, Christopher (2002). The Cannibal Hymn: A Cultural and Literary Study. Liverpool: Liverpool University Press. ISBN 978-0-85323-706-8.
- Faulkner, Raymond O. (2004). The Ancient Egyptian Coffin Texts. Oxford: Oxbow Books. ISBN 9780856687549.
- Goedicke, Hans (1971). Re-used blocks from the Pyramid of Amenemhat I at Lisht. Vol. 20. New York: The Metropolitan Museum of Art Egyptian Expedition. ISBN 978-0-87099-107-3.
- Grimal, Nicolas (1992). A History of Ancient Egypt. Translated by Ian Shaw. Oxford: Blackwell Publishing. ISBN 978-0-631-19396-8.
- Gros de Beler, Aude (2000). The Nile. Paris: Molière Editions. ISBN 978-2907670333.
- Hawass, Zahi (2015). Magic of the Pyramids: My adventures in Archeology. Montevarchi, Italy: Harmakis Edizioni. ISBN 978-88-98301-33-1.
- Hays, Harold M. (2009). "Unreading the pyramids". Bulletin de l'Institut Français d'Archéologie Orientale. 109: 195–220. ISSN 0255-0962.
- Hays, Harold M. (2012). The Organization of the Pyramid Texts: Typology and Disposition (Volume 1). Probleme de Ägyptologie. Vol. Band 31. Leiden & Boston: Brill. ISBN 978-90-04-22749-1. ISSN 0169-9601.
- Hellum, Jennifer (2007). The Pyramids. Westport, CT: Greenwood Press. ISBN 978-0-313-32580-9.
- Hellum, Jennifer (2012). "The use of myth in the Pyramid Texts". In Knoblauch, Christian M.; Gill, James C. (eds.). Egyptology in Australia and New Zealand 2009: Proceedings of the Conference Held in Melbourne, September 4th–6th. Oxford: Archaeopress. pp. 41–46. ISBN 978-1-4073-0941-5.
- Janák, Jiří (2013). Wendrick, Willeke; Dieleman, Jacco; Frood, Elizabeth; Baines, John (eds.). "Akh". UCLA Encyclopedia of Egyptology. Los Angeles: University of California. ISBN 978-0-615-21403-0. ISSN 2693-7425.
- Jiménez-Serrano, Alejandro (2012). Kahl, Jochem; Kloth, Nicole (eds.). "On the construction of the mortuary temple of King Unas". Studien zur Altägyptischen Kultur. 41. Hamburg: Helmut Buske Verlag GmBH: 153–162. ISBN 978-3-8754-8941-5.
- Labrousse, Audran; Lauer, Jean-Philippe; Leclant, Jean (1977). Le temple haut du complexe funéraire du roi Ounas (in French). Le Caire: Institut français d'archéologie orientale du Caire. OCLC 249491871.
- Lehner, Mark (2008). The Complete Pyramids. New York: Thames & Hudson. ISBN 978-0-500-28547-3.
- Lesko, Leonard (2001). "Funerary literature". In Redford, Donald B. (ed.). The Oxford Encyclopedia of Ancient Egypt, Volume 1. Oxford: Oxford University Press. pp. 570–575. ISBN 978-0-19-510234-5.
- Lucas, Alfred (1959) [1948]. Ancient Egyptian Materials and Industries (Third Edition, Revised ed.). London: Edward Arnold (Publishers) LTD. OCLC 1057992706.
- Málek, Jaromír (2000). "Old Kingdom rulers as "local saints" in the Memphite area during the Old Kingdom". In Bárta, Miroslav; Krejčí, Jaromír (eds.). Abusir and Saqqara in the Year 2000. Prague: Academy of Sciences of the Czech Republic – Oriental Institute. pp. 241–258. ISBN 978-80-85425-39-0.
- Málek, Jaromír (2003). "The Old Kingdom (c. 2686–2160 BC)". In Shaw, Ian (ed.). The Oxford History of Ancient Egypt. Oxford: Oxford University Press. pp. 83–107. ISBN 978-0-19-815034-3.
- Manuelian, Peter Der (1999). "Memphite private tombs of the Old Kingdom". In Bard, Kathryn (ed.). Encyclopedia of the Archaeology of Ancient Egypt. London & New York: Routledge. pp. 594–598. ISBN 978-0-203-98283-9.
- Mathieu, Bernard (1997). "La signification du serdab dans la pyramide d'Ounas: L'architecture des appartements funéraires royaux à la lumière des textes des pyramides". In Berger, Catherine; Mathieu, Bernard (eds.). Études sur l'Ancien Empire et la nécropole de Saqqâra dédiées à Jean-Phillipe Lauer. Orientalie Monspeliensia IX (in French). Montpellier: Université Paul Valéry-Montpellier III. pp. 289–304. ISBN 978-2842690472.
- Megahed, Mohamed (2016). "The antichambre carée in the Old Kingdom. Decoration and function". In Landgráfová, Renata; Mynářová, Jana (eds.). Rich and great: studies in honour of Anthony J. Spalinger on the occasion of his 70th Feast of Thoth. Prague: Charles University in Prague, Faculty of Arts. pp. 239–259. ISBN 978-8073086688.
- Morales, Antonio J. (2006). "Traces of official and popular veneration to Nyuserra Iny at Abusir. Late Fifth Dynasty to the Middle Kingdom". In Bárta, Miroslav; Coppens, Filip; Krejčí, Jaromír (eds.). Abusir and Saqqara in the Year 2005, Proceedings of the Conference held in Prague (June 27–July 5, 2005). Prague: Academy of Sciences of the Czech Republic, Oriental Institute. pp. 311–341. ISBN 978-80-7308-116-4.
- Nicholson, Paul T.; Shaw, Ian, eds. (2006). Ancient Egyptian Materials and Technology. Cambridge: Cambridge University Press. ISBN 978-0-521-45257-1.
- Ossian, Clair R. (2001). "Quartzite". In Redford, Donald B. (ed.). The Oxford Encyclopedia of Ancient Egypt, Volume 3. Oxford: Oxford University Press. pp. 104–105. ISBN 978-0-19-510234-5.
- Ray, John D. (1999). "Saqqara, Late period and Greco-Roman tombs". In Bard, Kathryn (ed.). Encyclopedia of the Archaeology of Ancient Egypt. London & New York: Routledge. pp. 844–847. ISBN 978-0-203-98283-9.
- Schneider, Hans D. (1999). "Saqqara, New Kingdom private tombs". In Bard, Kathryn (ed.). Encyclopedia of the Archaeology of Ancient Egypt. London & New York: Routledge. pp. 847–854. ISBN 978-0-203-98283-9.
- Seidlmayer, Stephan (2003). "The First Intermediate Period (c. 2160–2055 BC)". In Shaw, Ian (ed.). The Oxford History of Ancient Egypt. Oxford University Press. pp. 108–136. ISBN 978-0-19-815034-3.
- Shaw, Ian, ed. (2003). The Oxford History of Ancient Egypt. Oxford: Oxford University Press. ISBN 978-0-19-815034-3.
- Smith, Mark (2009). Wendrick, Willeke; Dieleman, Jacco; Frood, Elizabeth; Baines, John (eds.). "Democratization of the Afterlife". UCLA Encyclopedia of Egyptology. Los Angeles: University of California. ISBN 978-0-615-21403-0. ISSN 2693-7425.
- Smith, Mark (2017). Following Osiris: Perspectives on the Osirian Afterlife from Four Millennia. Oxford: Oxford University Press. ISBN 978-0-19-108976-3.
- Stadelmann, Rainier (1985). Die ägyptischen Pyramiden: Von Ziegelbau zum Weltwunder. Kulturgeschichte der antiken Welt (in German). Vol. 30. Mainz am Rhein: Phillip von Zabern. ISBN 978-3-8053-0855-7. OCLC 961317530.
- Strudwick, Nigel (1985). Davies, W. V. (ed.). The Administration of Egypt in the Old Kingdom: The Highest Titles and Their Holders. London: KPI Limited. ISBN 978-0-7103-0107-9.
- Verner, Miroslav (1994). Forgotten Pharaohs, Lost Pyramids: Abusir (PDF). Prague: Academia Škodaexport. ISBN 978-80-200-0022-4. Archived from the original (PDF) on 2011-02-01.
- Verner, Miroslav (2001a). "Archaeological Remarks on the 4th and 5th Dynasty Chronology" (PDF). Archiv Orientální. 69 (3): 363–418. ISSN 0044-8699.
- Verner, Miroslav (2001b). "Old Kingdom". In Redford, Donald B. (ed.). The Oxford Encyclopedia of Ancient Egypt, Volume 2. Oxford: Oxford University Press. pp. 585–591. ISBN 978-0-19-510234-5.
- Verner, Miroslav (2001c). "Pyramid". In Redford, Donald B. (ed.). The Oxford Encyclopedia of Ancient Egypt, Volume 3. Oxford: Oxford University Press. pp. 87–95. ISBN 978-0-19-510234-5.
- Verner, Miroslav (2001d). The Pyramids: The Mystery, Culture and Science of Egypt's Great Monuments. New York: Grove Press. ISBN 978-0-8021-1703-8.
- Verner, Miroslav (2020). The Pyramids: The Archaeology and History of Egypt's Iconic Monuments. Cairo: American University in Cairo. ISBN 978-9-77-416988-5.
- Wegner, Josef W. (2001). "Royal cults". In Redford, Donald B. (ed.). The Oxford Encyclopedia of Ancient Egypt, Volume 1. Oxford: Oxford University Press. pp. 332–336. ISBN 978-0-19-510234-5.
- Wilkinson, Richard H. (2000). The Complete Temples of Ancient Egypt. New York: Thames & Hudson. ISBN 978-0-500-05100-9.
- Wilkinson, Toby A. H. (2005). Early Dynastic Egypt. London & New York: Routledge. ISBN 978-0-415-18633-9.
- Wilkinson, Toby A. H. (2016). Writings from Ancient Egypt. London: Penguin Classics. ISBN 978-0141395951.
