= Pyramid Texts =

Oldest known ancient Egyptian funerary texts

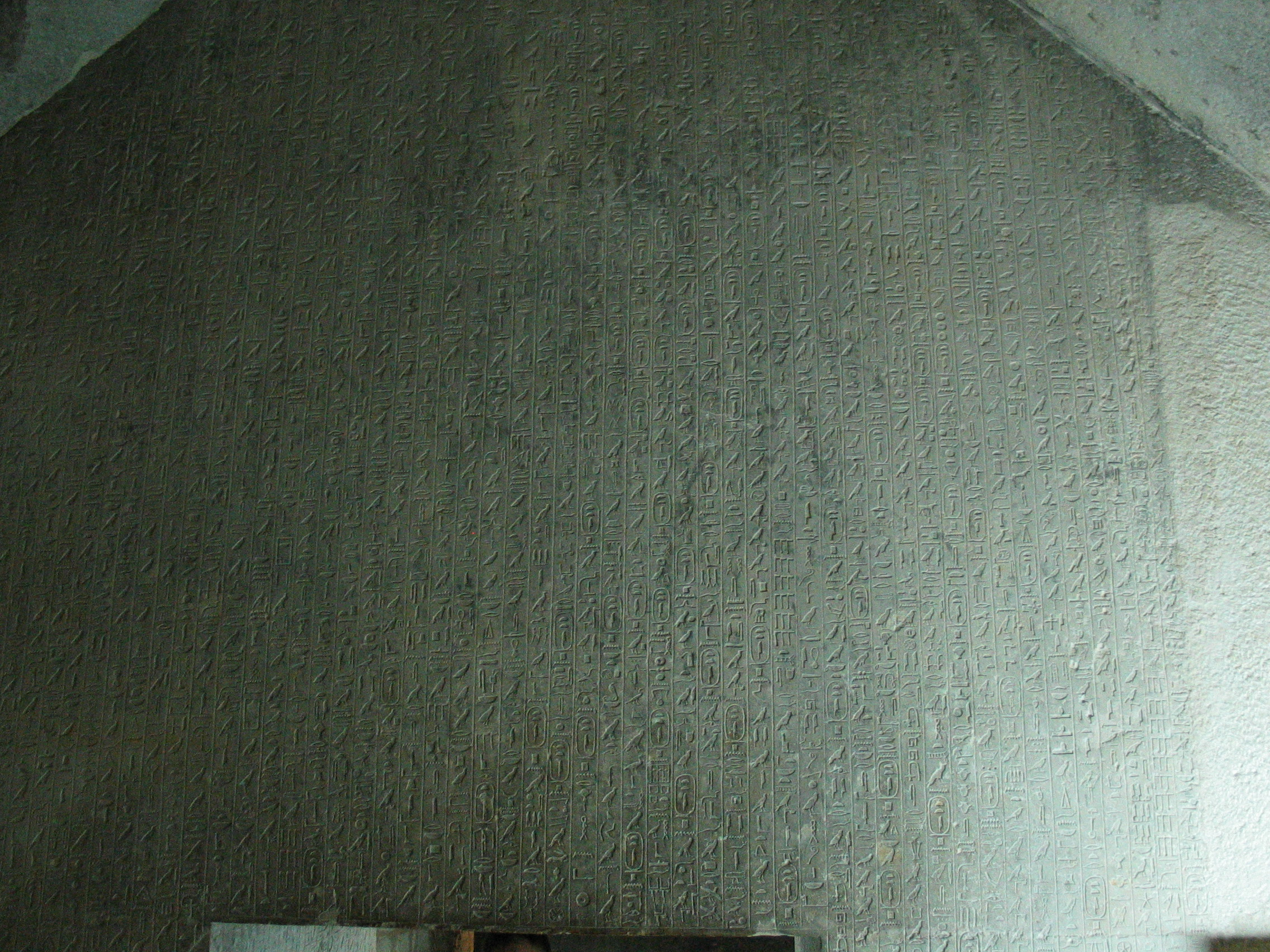
Pyramid Text inscribed on the wall of a subterranean room in Teti's pyramid, at Saqqara

The Pyramid Texts are the oldest ancient Egyptian funerary texts, dating to the late Old Kingdom. They are the earliest known corpus of ancient Egyptian religious texts. Written in Old Egyptian, the Pyramid Texts were carved onto the subterranean walls and sarcophagi of pyramids at Saqqara from the end of the Fifth Dynasty, and throughout the Sixth Dynasty of the Old Kingdom, and into the Eighth Dynasty of the First Intermediate Period. The oldest of the texts have been dated to c. 2400–2300 BCE.

Unlike the later Coffin Texts and Book of the Dead, the Pyramid Texts were reserved only for the pharaoh and were not illustrated. The use and occurrence of Pyramid Texts changed between the Old, Middle, and New Kingdoms of Ancient Egypt. During the Old Kingdom (2686 BCE – 2181 BCE), Pyramid Texts could be found in the pyramids of kings as well as three queens, named Wedjebten, Neith, and Iput. During the Middle Kingdom (2055 BCE – 1650 BCE), Pyramid Texts were not written in the pyramids of the pharaohs, as they opted to have the Coffin Texts inscribed in their own coffins instead, but the traditions of the Pyramid Texts and their spells continued to be practiced. In the New Kingdom (1550 BCE – 1070 BCE), the Pyramid Texts seems to have lost its exclusivity, appearing on the tombs of officials.

== Discovery ==
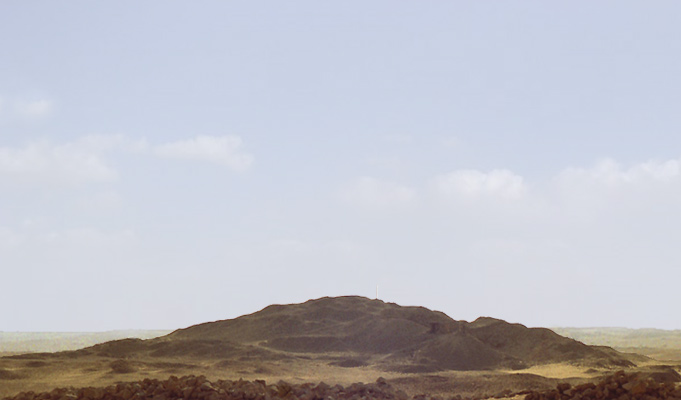
Pyramid of Merenre I, one of the earliest pyramids in which Maspero discovered the Pyramid Texts.

French archaeologist and Egyptologist Gaston Maspero, director of the French Institute for Oriental Archaeology in Cairo, arrived in Egypt in 1880. He chose a site in South Saqqara, a hill that had been mapped by the Prussian Egyptologist Karl Richard Lepsius in 1842, for his first archaeological dig. There, Maspero found the ruins of a large structure, which he concluded must be the pyramid of Pepi I of the Sixth Dynasty. During the excavations he was able to gain access to the subterranean rooms, and discovered that the walls of the structure were covered in hieroglyphic text. Maspero contacted the 'director of the excavations' in Egypt, Auguste Mariette, to inform him of the discovery. Mariette concluded that the structure must be a mastaba, as no writing had previously been discovered in a pyramid.

Maspero continued his excavations at a second structure, around one kilometre (0.62 mi) south-west of the first, in search of more evidence. This second structure was determined to be the pyramid of Merenre I, Pepi I's successor. In it, Maspero discovered the same hieroglyphic text on the walls he had found in Pepi I's pyramid, and the mummy of a man in the sarcophagus of the burial chamber. This time, he visited Mariette personally, who again rejected the findings, saying on his deathbed that "[i]n thirty years of Egyptian excavations I have never seen a pyramid whose underground rooms had hieroglyphs written on their walls." Throughout 1881, Maspero continued to direct investigations of other sites in Saqqara, and more texts were found in each of the pyramids of Unas, Teti, and Pepi II. Maspero began publishing his findings in the Recueil des Travaux from 1882 and continued to be involved until 1886 in the excavations of the pyramid in which the texts had been found.

Maspero published the first corpora of the text in 1894 in French under the title Les inscriptions des pyramides de Saqqarah. Translations were made by German Egyptologist Kurt Heinrich Sethe to German in 1908–1910 in Die altägyptischen Pyramidentexte. The concordance that Sethe published is considered to be the standard version of the texts. Samuel A. B. Mercer published a translation into English of Sethe's work in 1952. British Egyptologist Raymond O. Faulkner presented the texts in English in 1969 in The Ancient Egyptian Pyramid Texts.

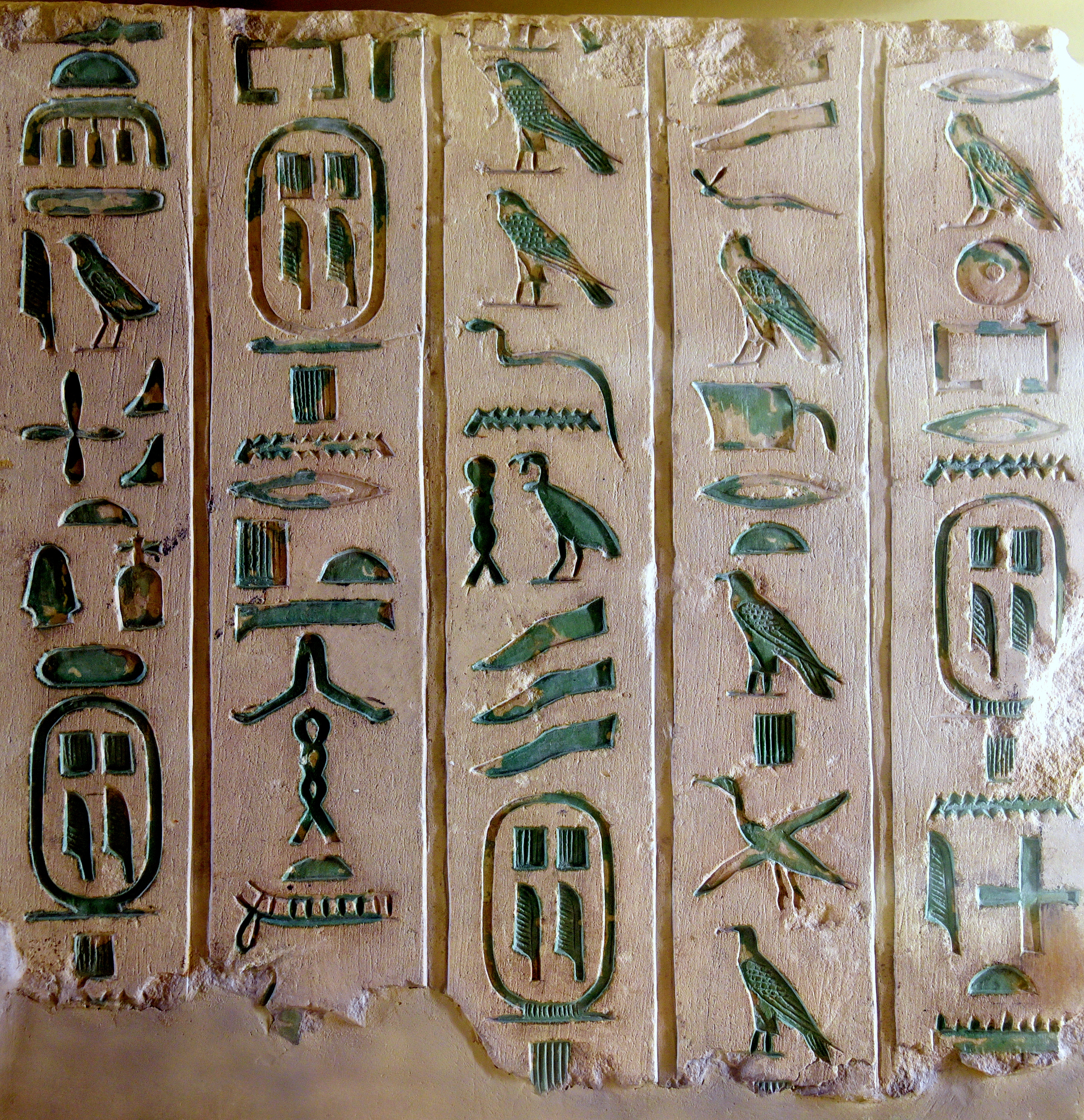
Cartouches of Pepi I and Pyramid Texts. Limestone block fragment from the debris of the north wall of the antechamber within the pyramid of Pepi I at Saqqara. Petrie Museum of Egyptian Archaeology

Between 1926 and 1932, Gustave Jéquier conducted the first systematic investigations of Pepi II and his wives' pyramids – Neith, Iput II, and Wedjebetni. Jéquier also conducted the excavations of Qakare Ibi's pyramid. He later published the complete corpus of texts found in these five pyramids. Since 1958, expeditions under the directions of Jean-Philippe Lauer, Jean Sainte-Fare Garnot, and Jean Leclant have undertaken a major restoration project of the pyramids belonging to Teti, Pepi I, and Merenre I, as well as the pyramid of Unas. By 1999, the pyramid of Pepi had been opened to the public. Debris was cleared away from the pyramid, while research continued under the direction of Audran Labrousse. The corpus of pyramid texts in Pepi I's pyramid were published in 2001. In 2010, more such texts were discovered in Behenu's tomb.

To date, Pyramid Texts have been discovered in the pyramids of these pharaohs and queens:

Unas	Dynasty V	pharaoh c. 2353–2323 BCE
Teti	Dynasty VI	pharaoh c. 2323–2291 BCE
Pepi I	Dynasty VI	pharaoh c. 2289–2255 BCE
Akhesenpepi II	Dynasty VI	wife of Pepi I
Merenre I	Dynasty VI	pharaoh c. 2255–2246 BCE
Pepi II	Dynasty VI	pharaoh c. 2246–2152 BCE
Neith	Dynasty VI	wife of Pepi II
Iput II	Dynasty VI	wife of Pepi II
Wedjebetni	Dynasty VI	wife of Pepi II
Behenu	Dynasty VI	probable wife of Pepi II
Qakare Ibi	Dynasty VIII	pharaoh c. 2109–2107 BCE

== Purpose ==
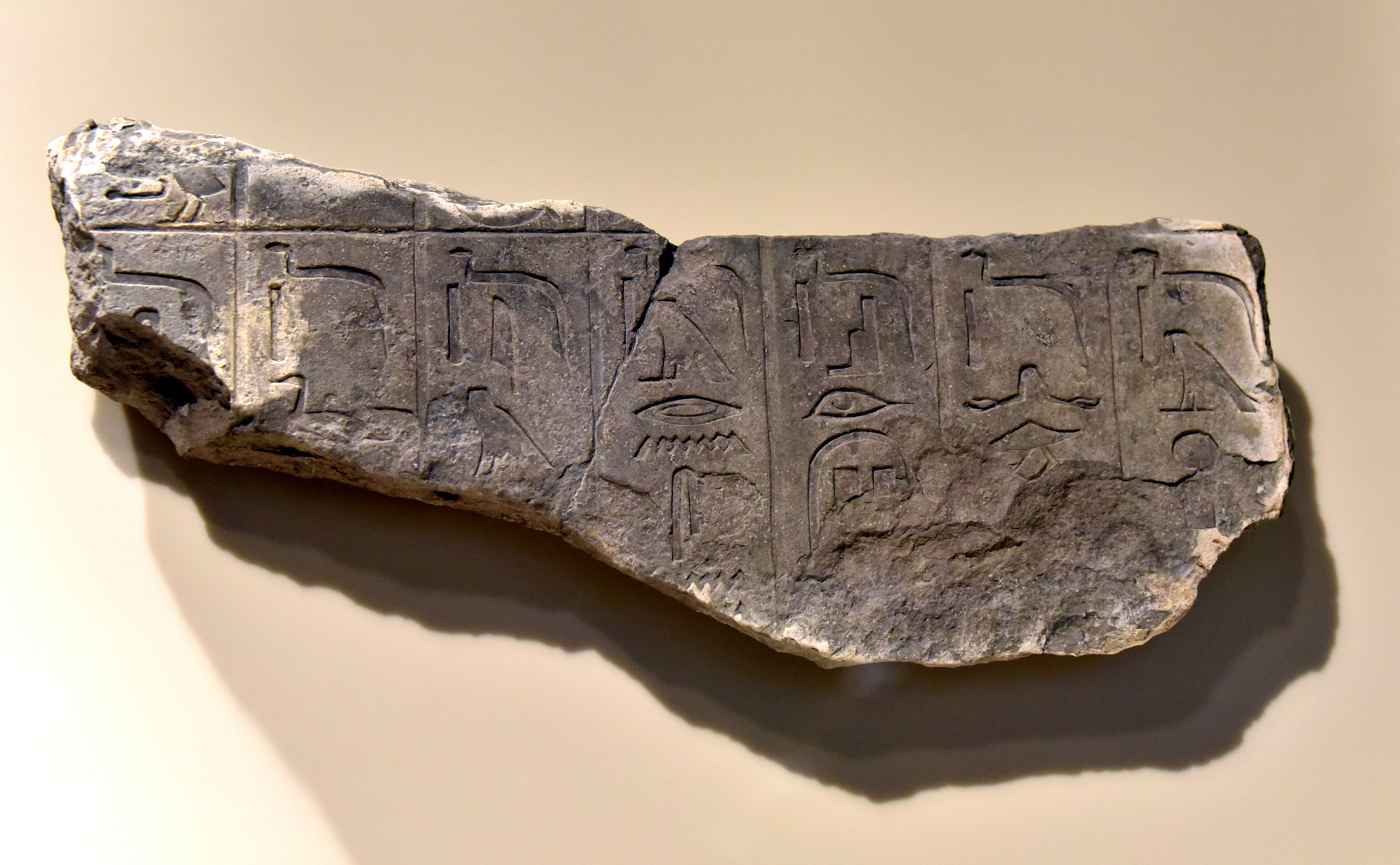
Painted relief fragment with the spells 354 and 255 of Pyramid Texts. From the pyramid of Pepi II at Saqqara. Neues Museum

The spells, or utterances, of the Pyramid Texts were primarily concerned with enabling the transformation of the deceased into an akh (where those judged worthy could mix with the gods). The spells of the Pyramid Texts are divided into two broad categories: sacerdotal texts and personal texts.

The sacerdotal texts are ritual in nature, and were conducted by the lector priest addressing the deceased in the second person. They consist of offering spells, short spells recited in the presentation of an offering, and recitations which are predominantly instructional. These texts appear in the Offering and Insignia rituals, the Resurrection Ritual, and in the four pyramids containing the Morning Ritual. The writing in these texts (Dramatic Texts) suggests the formulation of these texts may have occurred around the time of the Second and Third dynasties.

The remaining texts are personal, and are broadly concerned with guiding the spirit out of the tomb, and into new life. They consist of provisioning, transition, and apotropaic – or protective – texts. The provisioning texts deal with the deceased taking command of his own food-supply, and demanding nourishment from the gods. One example of these texts is the king's response in Unas' pyramid. The transition texts – otherwise known as the Sakhu or Glorifications – are predominantly about the transformation of the deceased into an Akh, and their ascent, mirroring the motion of the gods, into the sky. These texts form the largest part of the corpus, and are dominated by the youngest texts composed in the Fifth and possibly Sixth dynasties. Apotropaic texts consist of short protective spells for warding off threats to the body and tomb. Due to the archaic style of writing, these texts are considered to be the oldest, and are the most difficult to interpret.

These utterances were meant to be chanted by those who were reciting them. They contained many verbs such as "fly" and "leap", depicting the actions taken by the pharaohs to get to the afterlife. The spells delineate all of the ways the pharaoh could travel, including the use of ramps, stairs, ladders and, most importantly, flying. The spells could also be used to call the gods to help, even threatening them if they did not comply. It was common for the pyramid texts to be written in the first person, but not uncommon for texts to be later changed to the third person. Often this depended on who was reciting the texts and who they were recited for. Many of the texts include accomplishments of the pharaoh as well as the things they did for the Egyptian people during the time of their rule. These texts were used to both guide the pharaohs to the afterlife, but also to inform and assure the living that the soul made it to its final destination.

== Appearance in pyramids ==
=== Pyramid of Unas ===
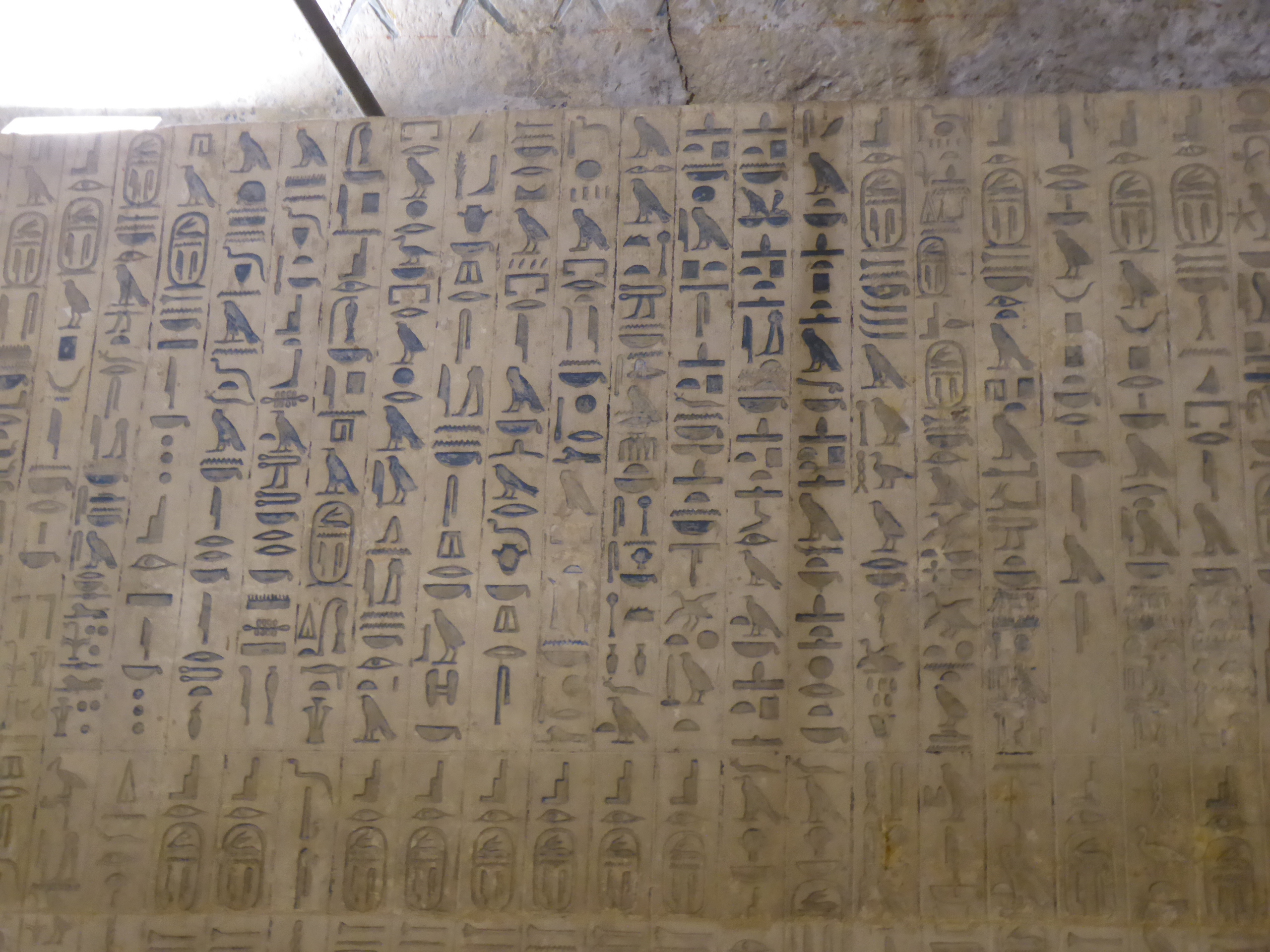
The Pyramid Texts inscribed in Unas' pyramid

The texts first appeared in the pyramid of the last pharaoh of the Fifth Dynasty, that belonging to Unas. A total of 283 spells (Note: Exact numbers vary among sources: 236, 228, 226.) appear on the subterranean walls of Unas' pyramid. These spells are the smallest and best-preserved corpus of the texts in the Old Kingdom. Copies of all but a single spell, PT 200, inscribed in the pyramid appeared throughout the Middle Kingdom and later, including a near-complete replica of the texts inscribed in the tomb of the 12th-Dynasty High Priest Senwosretankh at El-Lisht.

Unas' pyramid, situated between the pyramids of Djoser and Sekhemkhet in North Saqqara, was the smallest of those built in the Old Kingdom. It had a core built six steps high from roughly dressed limestone, encased in a layer of carefully cut fine white limestone. It had a base length of 57.75 m (189 ft) with an incline of 56° which gave the pyramid a height of 43 m (141 ft). The substructure was accessed through an entrance in the pavement of a chapel on the north face of the pyramid. The entry led into a downward sloping corridor, followed by a 'corridor-chamber' with three granite portcullises that guarded the entrance into the horizontal passage. The horizontal passage ends at the antechamber of the substructure and is guarded by a fourth granite portcullis. The antechamber connects to two further rooms, a room with three recesses for holding statues – called the serdab – to the east, and the burial chamber with the ruler's sarcophagus to the west. The roofs of both the antechamber and burial chamber were gabled.

With the exception of the walls immediately surrounding the sarcophagus, which were lined with alabaster and painted to resemble reed mats with a wood-frame enclosure, the remaining walls of the antechamber, burial chamber, and a section of the horizontal passage were covered with vertical columns of hieroglyphs that make up the Pyramid Texts. Unas' sarcophagus was left without inscription. The king's royal titulary did not appear on the walls surrounding it, as it does in later pyramids.

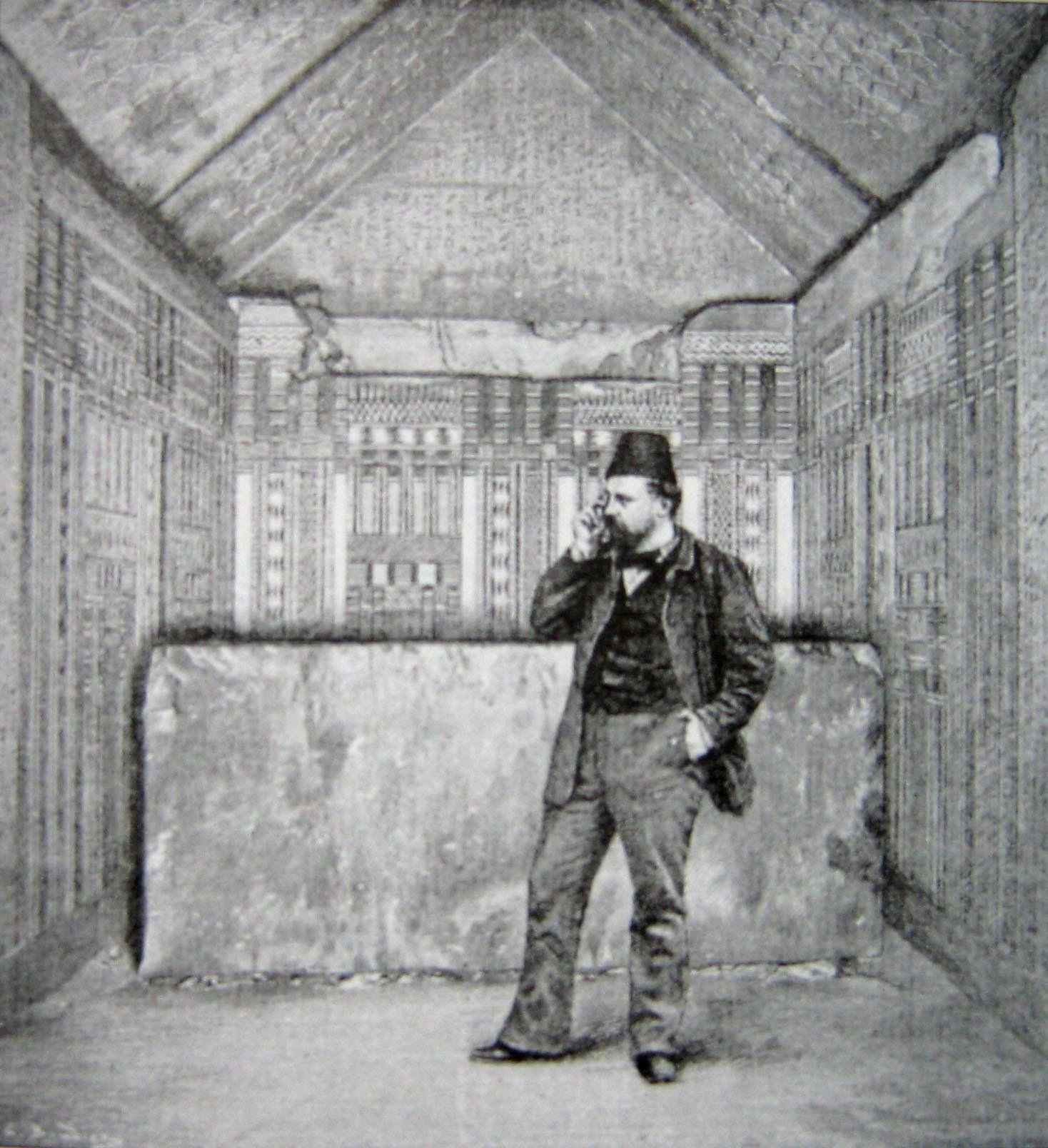
Maspero in the burial chamber of Unas' pyramid, which has lines of protective spells on the west gable, which are the only inscriptions on the walls surrounding the sarcophagus

The west gable of the burial chamber is inscribed with protective spells; in later pyramids the gable was used for texts commending the king to Nut, and, from Pepi I onwards, also for Sakhu, or 'glorifications', for the transformation into an Akh. The other walls of the burial chamber are primarily dedicated to ritual texts. The north wall, along with the northern part of the east wall and passage, is dedicated to the Offering Ritual. Spatial considerations required that part of the ritual be inscribed on other walls, and likely explains the omission of the Insignia Ritual altogether from the pyramid. The Offering Ritual, from the 'initial libation' to the 'dedication of offerings', occupies the north wall; it is arrayed into three horizontal registers.

The set up and layout of the Unas pyramid were replicated and expanded on for future pyramids. The causeway ran 750 meters long and is still in good condition, unlike many causeways found in similar ancient Egyptian pyramids. In the pyramid of Unas, the ritual texts could be found in the underlying supporting structure. The antechamber and corridor contained texts and spells personalized to the Pharaoh himself.

Kurt Sethe's first edition of the pyramid texts contained 714 distinct spells. Later additional spells were discovered, for a total of 759. No single edition includes all recorded spells. The following example of a spell comes from the pyramid of Unas. It was to be recited in the South Side Burial Chamber and Passage, and it was the Invocation to New Life. Utterance 213:

Ho, Unas! You have not gone away dead: you have gone away alive.
Sit on Osiris's chair, with your baton in your arm, and govern the living;
with your water lily scepter in your arm, and govern those
of the inaccessible places.
Your lower arms are of Atum, your upper arms of Atum, your belly of
Atum, your back of Atum, your rear of Atum, your legs of Atum, your
face of Anubis.
Horus's mounds shall serve you; Seth's mounds shall serve you.

== Offerings and rituals ==
The various Pyramid Texts often contained writings of rituals and offerings to the gods. Examples of these rituals are the opening of the mouth ceremony, offering rituals, and insignia ritual. Both monetary and prayer-based offerings were made in the pyramids and were written in the Pyramid Texts in hopes of getting the pharaoh to a desirable afterlife. Rituals such as the opening of the mouth and eye ceremony were very important for the Pharaoh in the afterlife. This ceremony involved the Kher-Heb (the chief lector priest), along with assistants, opening the eyes and mouth of the dead while reciting prayers and spells. Mourners were encouraged to cry out as special instruments were used to cut holes in the mouth. After the ceremony was complete, it was believed that the dead could eat, speak, breathe, and see in the afterlife.

The Egyptian pyramids are made up of various corridors, tunnels, and rooms, each of which have differing significance and use during the burial and ritual processes. Texts were written and recited by priests in a very particular order, often starting in the Valley Temple and finishing in the Coffin or Pyramid Room. The variety of offerings and rituals were also most likely recited in a particular order. The Valley Temple often contained an offering shrine, where rituals would be recited.

== Queens with Pyramid Texts ==
Pyramid Texts were found not only in the tombs of kings, but those of queens as well. Queen Neith, who was the wife of Pepi II, is one of three queens of the 6th dynasty whose tomb contains pyramid texts. The pyramids of the other two queens (both also thought to be wives of Pepi II), Iput II and Wedjebetni, also contained tombs inscribed with texts. Those of Neith have been kept in much better condition. Compared to the tombs of the kings, the layout and structure of those that belonged to these queens were much simpler. But the layout of the texts corresponded to similar walls and locations as those of the kings. For example, the Resurrection Ritual is found on the east end of the south wall. Due to the fact that the pyramid of Neith did not contain an antechamber, many of the spells normally written there were also written on the south wall.

The texts of Queen Neith were similar and different from those of the kings in a few additional ways. Like those of the kings, the use of both the first and third person is present in these Pyramid Texts. Neith's name is used throughout the texts to make them more personal. Many of the pronouns used throughout her pyramid texts are male, indicative of the parallels between the texts of the kings and queens, but a few female pronouns can be found. The texts also contain spells and utterances that are meant to be read by both the spirit herself as well as others addressing her.

== Examples ==
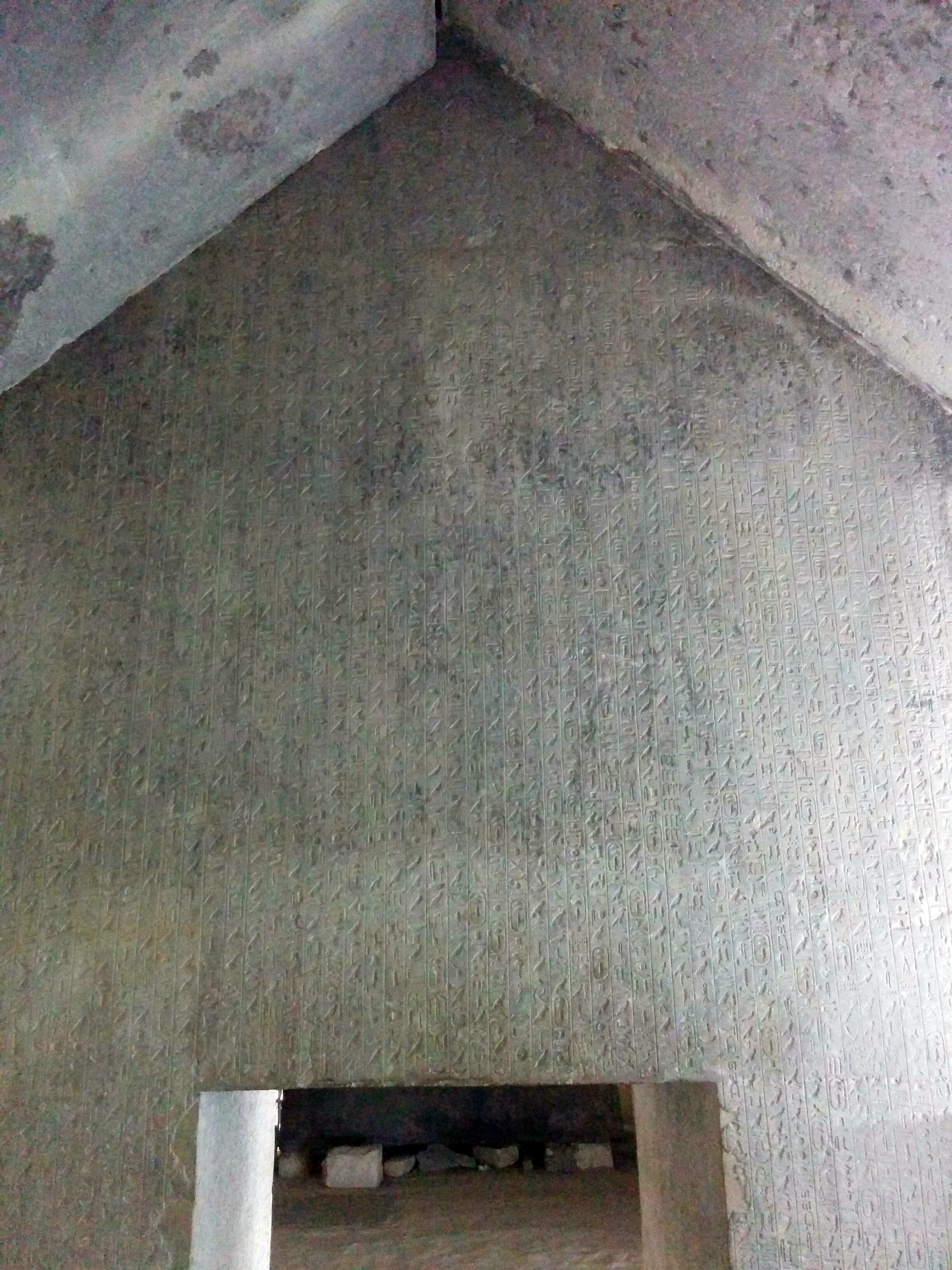
Pyramid Text inscribed on the wall of a subterranean room in Teti's pyramid

After death, the king must first rise from his tomb. Utterance 373 describes:

Oho! Oho! Rise up, O Teti!
Take your head, collect your bones,
Gather your limbs, shake the earth from your flesh!
Take your bread that rots not, your beer that sours not,
Stand at the gates that bar the common people!
The gatekeeper comes out to you, he grasps your hand,
Takes you into heaven, to your father Geb.
He rejoices at your coming, gives you his hands,
Kisses you, caresses you,
Sets you before the spirits, the imperishable stars...
The hidden ones worship you,
The great ones surround you,
The watchers wait on you,
Barley is threshed for you,
Emmer is reaped for you,
Your monthly feasts are made with it,
Your half-month feasts are made with it,
As ordered done for you by Geb, your father,
Rise up, O Teti, you shall not die!

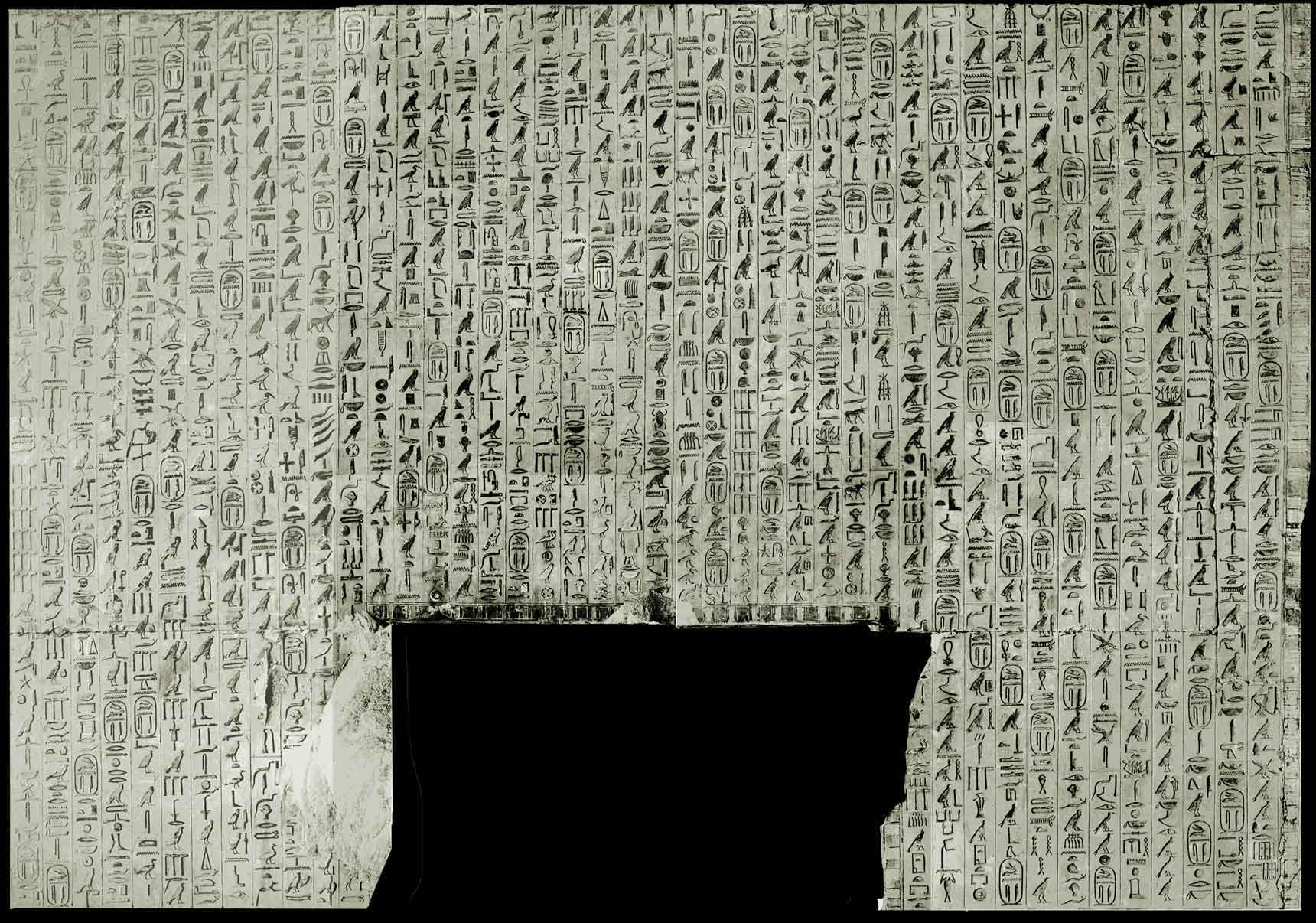
Pyramid Text utterances 302 to 312 on Unas' burial chamber wall

The texts then describe several ways for the pharaoh to reach the heavens, one of which is by climbing a ladder. In utterance 304 the king says:

Hail, daughter of Anubis, above the hatches of heaven,
Comrade of Thoth, above the ladder's rails,
Open Unas's path, let Unas pass!

Another way is by ferry. If the boatman refuses to take him, the king has other plans:

If you fail to ferry Unas,
He will leap and sit on the wing of Thoth,
Then he will ferry Unas to that side!

=== Cannibal Hymn ===
Utterances 273 and 274 are sometimes known as the "Cannibal Hymn", because it seems to be describing the king hunting and eating parts of the gods: however, as Renouf pointed out when it was first published:

Those who see in all mythology a survival of ideas and practices of savages, and think it a clever thing to explain by the habits of cannibals the myth of the god who swallows all his children, without troubling themselves with that portion of the myth which gives the key to all the rest, how the children come to life again

As has been observed, the spell is echoing how the Goddess Nut (as the Sky) causing the stars to disappear at dawn is likened to a sow eating her offspring so also is the King as the dawn sun. Utterance 216 describes the King in stellar form as being "swallowed up" at dawn with the other stars.

The Cannibal Hymn represents a discrete episode (Utterances 273–274) in the anthology of ritual texts that make up the Pyramid Texts of the Old Kingdom period. Appearing first in the Pyramid of Unas at the end of the Fifth Dynasty, the Cannibal Hymn preserves an early royal butchery ritual in which the deceased king – assisted by the god Shezmu – slaughters, cooks and eats the gods as sacrificial bulls, thereby incorporating in himself their divine powers in order that he might negotiate his passage into the Afterlife and guarantee his transformation as a celestial divinity ruling in the heavens. The style and format of the Cannibal Hymn are characteristic of the oral-recitational poetry of pharaonic Egypt, marked by allusive metaphor and the exploitation of wordplay and homophony in its verbal recreation of a butchery ritual.

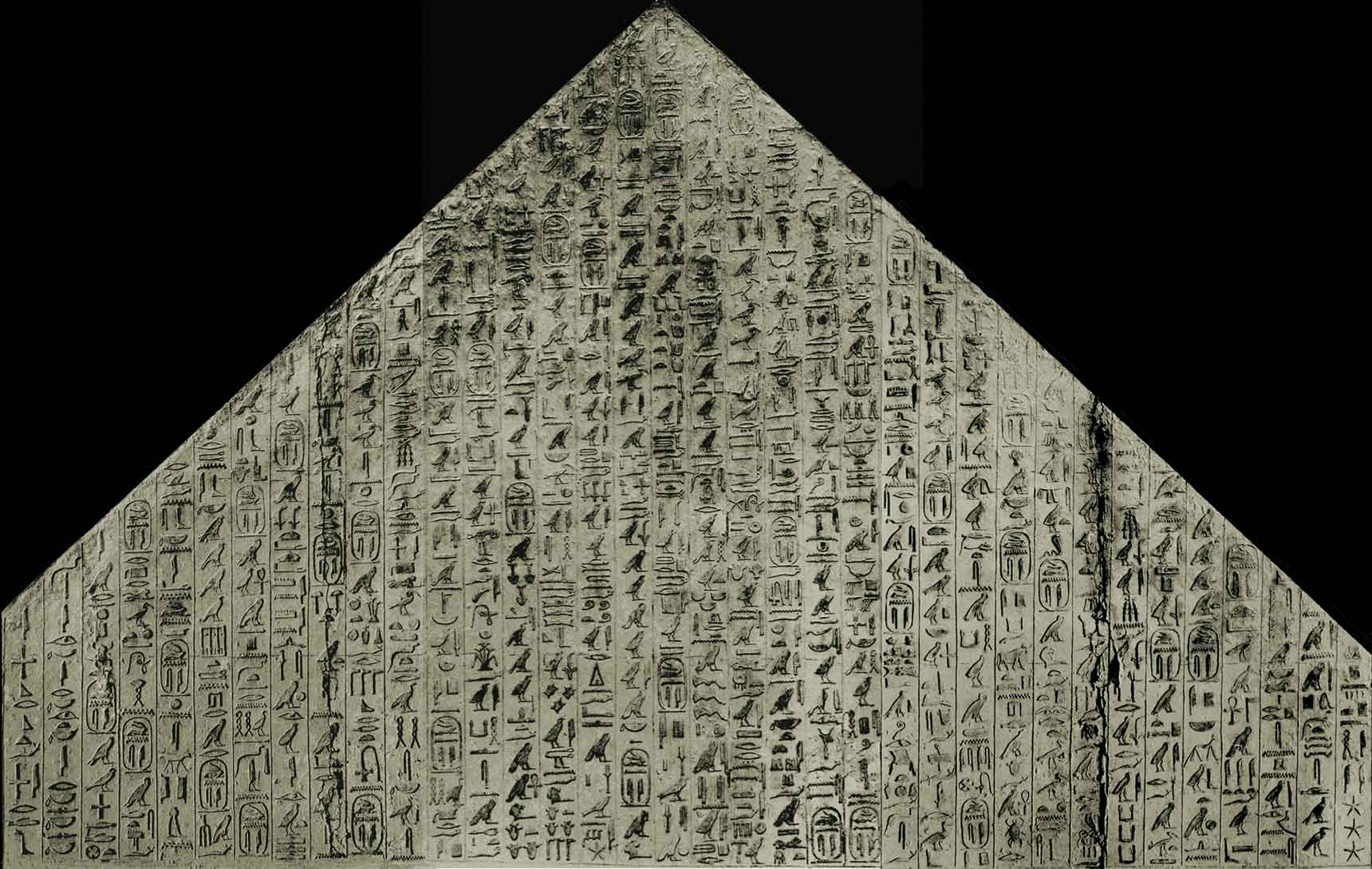
Pyramid text utterances 273 to 276 on Unas' burial chamber wall

Apart from the burial of Unas, only the Pyramid of Teti displays the Cannibal Hymn.

A god who lives on his fathers,
who feeds on his mothers...
Unas is the bull of heaven
Who rages in his heart,
Who lives on the being of every god,
Who eats their entrails
When they come, their bodies full of magic
From the Isle of Flame...

But the same spells (PT 269) also declare:

May I be with you, you gods;
May you be with me, you gods.
May I live with you, you gods;
May you live with me, you gods.
I love you, you gods;
May you love me, you gods.

The Cannibal Hymn later reappeared in the Coffin Texts as Spell 573. It was dropped by the time the Book of the Dead was being copied.

=== Curse Hymn ===
Utterance 534 is sometimes known as the "Curse Hymn", because it is a rare Pharaoh's curse only found in the Pyramid of Pepi I. An apotropaic text, its purpose is to ward off any malignant gods, assist the king's passage to the sky, and curse anyone who damages and robs the pyramid.

He who shall give his finger against this pyramid
and this god's enclosure of Pepi and of his ka,
He has given his finger against Horus’s Enclosure in the Cool Waters.
Nephthys shall traverse for him every place of his [father] Geb.
His case has been heard by the Ennead and he has nothing, He has no house.
He is one accursed, he is one who eats his own body.

== Sources ==
- Allen, James P. (2000). Middle Egyptian: An Introduction to the Language and Culture of Hieroglyphs. Cambridge, UK: Cambridge University Press. ISBN 0-521-77483-7.
- Allen, James (2001). "Pyramid Texts". In Redford, Donald B. (ed.). The Oxford Encyclopedia of Ancient Egypt, Volume 3. Oxford: Oxford University Press. pp. 95–98. ISBN 978-0-19-510234-5.
- Allen, James (2005). Der Manuelian, Peter (ed.). The Ancient Egyptian Pyramid Texts. Writings from the Ancient World, Number 23. Atlanta: Society of Biblical Literature. ISBN 978-1-58983-182-7.
- Allen, James P. (2015). The Ancient Egyptian Pyramid Texts. Atlanta, Georgia: Society of Biblical Literature. ISBN 978-1-62837-114-7.
- Allen, James; Allen, Susan; Anderson, Julie; et al. (1999). Egyptian Art in the Age of the Pyramids. New York: The Metropolitan Museum of Art. ISBN 978-0-8109-6543-0. OCLC 41431623.
- Chauvet, Violaine (2001). "Saqqara". In Redford, Donald B. (ed.). The Oxford Encyclopedia of Ancient Egypt, Volume 3. Oxford University Press. pp. 176–179. ISBN 978-0-19-510234-5.
- Clayton, Peter A. (1994). Chronicle of the Pharaohs. London: Thames & Hudson. ISBN 0-500-05074-0.
- Eyre, Christopher (2002). The Cannibal Hymn: A Cultural and Literary Study. Liverpool: Liverpool University Press. ISBN 978-0-85323-706-8.
- Dassow, Eva Von, ed. (2015). The Egyptian book of the dead : the book of going forth by day : being the papyrus of Ani (royal scribe of the divine offerings) : including the balance of chapters of the books of the dead known as the Theban Recension compiled from ancient texts, dating back to the roots of Egyptian civilization / written and illustrated circa 1250 B.C.E., by scribes and artists unknown. Translated by Faulkner, Raymond O.; Goelet, Ogden. Supervised by Renouf P. Le Page and Budge E.A. Wallis; Foreword by James Wasserman; Scholarship survey by Gunther J. Daniel; Preface by Carol Andrews (20th Anniversary ed.). San Francisco: Chronicle Books. ISBN 978-1452144382.
- Dodson, Aidan (2016). The Royal Tombs of Ancient Egypt. Barnsley, South Yorkshire: Pen & Sword Archaeology. ISBN 978-1-47382-159-0.
- Faulkner, Raymond O. (2004). The Ancient Egyptian Coffin Texts. Oxford: Oxbow Books. ISBN 9780856687549.
- Grimal, Nicolas (1992). A History of Ancient Egypt. Translated by Ian Shaw. Oxford: Blackwell publishing. ISBN 978-0-631-19396-8.
- Hays, Harold M (2012). The Organization of the Pyramid Texts : Typology and Disposition (Volume 1). Probleme de Ägyptologie. Vol. Band 31. Leiden, Boston: Brill. ISBN 978-90-04-22749-1. ISSN 0169-9601.
- Hornung, Erik (1997). The Ancient Egyptian Book of the Afterlife. Ithaca and London: Cornell University Press.
- Lehner, Mark (2008). The Complete Pyramids. New York: Thames & Hudson. ISBN 978-0-500-28547-3.
- Lichtheim, Miriam (1975). Ancient Egyptian Literature. Vol. 1. London, England: University of California Press. ISBN 0-520-02899-6.
- Malek, Jaromir (2003). "The Old Kingdom (c.2160-2055 BC)". In Shaw, Ian (ed.). The Oxford History of Ancient Egypt. Oxford University Press. pp. 83–107. ISBN 978-0-19-815034-3.
- Mercer, Samuel A. B. (1956). Literary Criticism of the Pyramid Texts. London: Luzac & Company LTD. OCLC 36229800.
- Osing, Jürgen (1994). "Zu Spruch 534 der Pyramidentexte". Hommages à Jean Leclant (in German). Vol. 1. Cairo: Institut français d'archéologie orientale. pp. 279–285. ISBN 2-7247-0134-8.
- Smith, Mark (2017). Following Osiris: Perspectives on the Osirian Afterlife from Four Millennia. Oxford: Oxford University Press. ISBN 978-0-19-958222-8.
- Verner, Miroslav (2001a). "Pyramid". In Redford, Donald B. (ed.). The Oxford Encyclopedia of Ancient Egypt, Volume 3. Oxford: Oxford University Press. pp. 87–95. ISBN 978-0-19-510234-5.
- Verner, Miroslav (2001b). The Pyramids: The Mystery, Culture and Science of Egypt's Great Monuments. New York: Grove Press. ISBN 978-0-8021-1703-8.
