= Pyramid of Merenre =

Smooth-sided pyramid

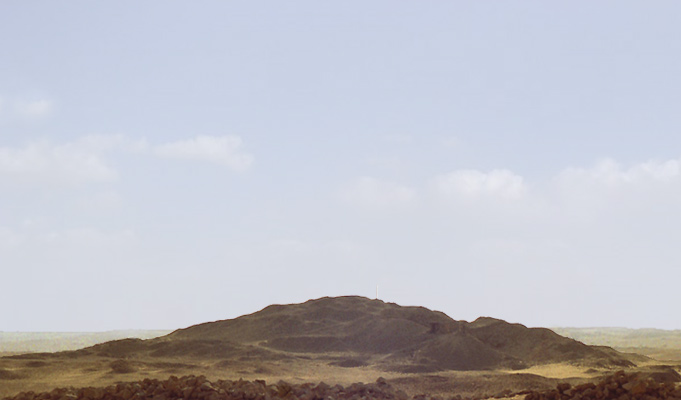
- Interactive map of Pyramid of Merenre
- 29.85055556°N 31.215°E
- Owner: Nemtyemsaf I
Ancient name
< ra mr r n > xa nfr O24
Khanefermerenre
Ḫˁj-nfr-Mrj-n-rˁw
The perfection of Merenre appears
- Constructed: c. 2280 BC
- Type: True (now ruined)
- Material: Limestone
- Height: 52.6 metres (173 ft)
- Base: 78.75 metres (258.4 ft)
- Slope: 52°

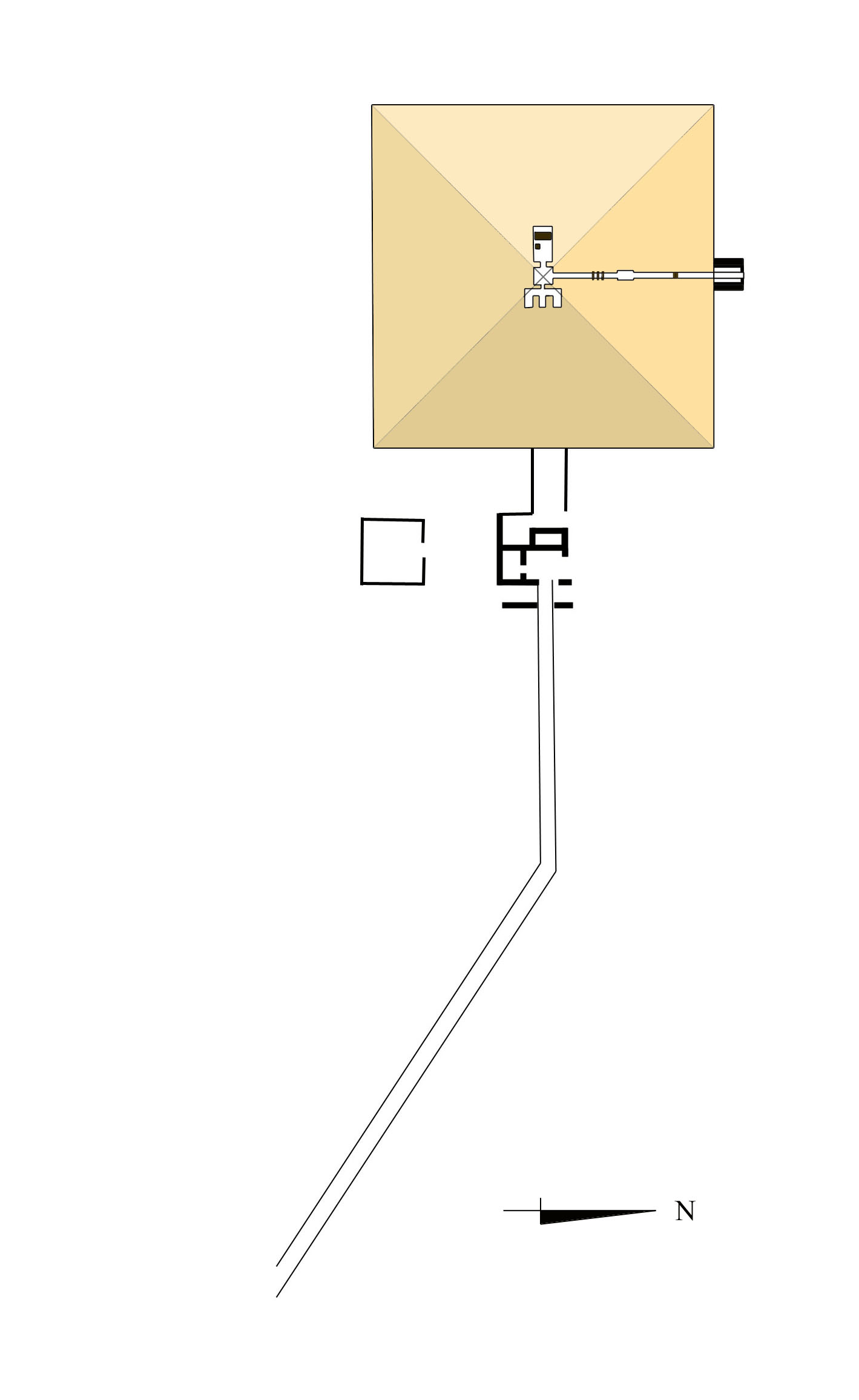
Diagram of the pyramid

The Pyramid of Merenre was constructed for Merenre Nemtyemsaf I during the Sixth Dynasty of Egypt at Saqqara 450 metres (1,480 ft) to the south-west of the pyramid of Pepi I and a similar distance to the Pyramid of Djedkare Isesi. Its ancient name was "Merenre's beauty shines" or perhaps "The Perfection of Merenre Appears". Today it consists mostly of ruins; it is hard to get to and is not open to the public.

The pyramid was 52.5 metres (172 ft 3 in) in height, 78.75 metres (258 ft 4 in) in base length with an inclination of 53°07'48". The causeway is 250 metres (820 ft) long and the complex was surrounded by a wall of mud brick.

Only traces of the mortuary temple have been found and the evidence indicates that construction was halted abruptly at one point and never resumed, probably upon the king's death.

The entrance to the burial chambers is on the north face which descends to a vestibule where another shaft leads to the antechamber. To the right of the antechamber is the burial chamber; to the left is another small room, a serdab. In the burial chamber a sarcophagus decorated with polychrome reliefs stood against the wall; when found, it was in good condition although it had been plundered. The ceiling of the burial chamber had an astrological theme and was covered with stars.

== Excavations ==
The pyramid was first examined in the 1830s by John Perring. Later in the 1880s the subterranean chambers were explored by Gaston Maspero, who was in search of Pyramid Texts; his expedition discovered a mummy inside the pyramid. It was thought to be from some later burial, although some modern scholars now believe that it was the mummy of Merenre after all. If so, that would make it the oldest-known intact royal mummy. Since the late 20th century a French team led by Jean Leclant has been researching the site.

== Pyramid ==
=== Pyramid Texts of Merenre ===
The Pyramid Texts originally appeared in the Pyramid of Unas at the end of the Fifth Dynasty initiating a tradition that carried on in the pyramids of the kings and queens of the Sixth through Eighth Dynasty, until the end of the Old Kingdom.

== See also ==
- Egyptian pyramid construction techniques
- List of Egyptian pyramids
- List of megalithic sites
