= Shezmu =

Ancient Egyptian earth and underworld god

- Shezmu presenting offerings
Name in hieroglyphs
N37 O34 G17 G43 A40 or M43 N37 O34 G17 G43
- Symbol: Oil, Wine, Perfume, Ointment, and Blood

Shezmu (alternatively Schesmu and Shesmu) is an ancient Egyptian deity with a contradictory character. He is an Underworld judge of the damned. He was worshiped from the early Old Kingdom period.

He was considered a god of ointments, perfume, and wine. In this role, he was associated with festivities, dancing, and singing. But he was also considered a god of blood, who could slaughter and dismember other deities. It is thought possible that the ancient Egyptians used red wine to symbolize blood in religious offerings, explaining why Shezmu is associated with both blood and wine.

Shezmu is an ancient Egyptian deity associated with the process of embalming, as well as with violence and protection. He is sometimes considered an aspect of Nefertum, Sometimes, they are even presented as brothers, with Nefertem having a lion’s head and Shezmu as the beautiful youth.

Shezmu was an ancient Egyptian deity who fought and defeated Apep, the serpent of chaos, during the sun god Ra’s nightly journey through the underworld. By destroying Apep, Shezmu prevented the annihilation of the sun and saved the world from falling into nonexistence.

Shezmu as a vulture-headed man

== Description ==
Shezmu was seldom depicted but when he was he appeared as a man with a lion's head holding a butcher's knife. In later times he appeared as a lion. If only his name was mentioned it often appeared with the determinative of an oil press, and sometimes only the oilpress was depicted. he was also depicted as a man with the head of a vulture holding butcher knives.

== Worship ==
Shezmu was a god with a contradictory personality. On one hand, he was lord of perfume, maker of all precious oil, lord of the oil press, lord of ointments and lord of wine. He was a celebration deity, like the goddess Meret. Old Kingdom texts mention a special feast celebrated for Shezmu: young men would press grapes with their feet and then dance and sing for Shezmu.

On the other hand, Shezmu was very vindictive and bloodthirsty. He was also lord of blood, great slaughterer of the gods, and he who dismembers bodies. In Old Kingdom Pyramid Texts, several prayers ask Shezmu to dismember and cook certain deities in an attempt to give the food to a deceased king. The deceased king needed the divine powers to survive the dangerous journey to the stars.

However, the interpretation remains open if the word "blood" is to be taken literally, as the ancient Egyptians symbolically offered red wine as "the blood of the gods" to several deities. This association was based simply on the dark red color of the wine, a circumstance that led to connections of Shezmu with other deities who could appear in red colors. Examples include deities such as Ra, Horus, and Kherty. The violent character of Shezmu made him a protector among the companions of Ra's nocturnal barque. Shezmu protected Ra by threatening the demons and brawling with them. In the Pyramid Texts, he does similar things.

It appears that starting in the New Kingdom, Shezmu's negative attributes became gradually overshadowed by the positive ones, although on a 21st Dynasty papyri his wine press appears to be filled with human heads in place of grapes (a depiction which was common earlier, on Middle Kingdom Coffin Texts). Then later, on the 26th Dynasty sarcophagus of the Divine Adoratrice Ankhnesneferibre, Shezmu is recorded as a fine oil maker for the god Ra. And even later, during the Greco-Roman period, the manufacture of the finest oils and perfumes for the gods became Shezmu's primary role.

== Cult ==
Shezmu's main cult center was located at the Fayum. Later, there were further shrines erected at Edfu and Dendera.
