= Senewosret-Ankh =

Ancient Egyptian High Priest of Ptah

- High Priest of Ptah in Memphis
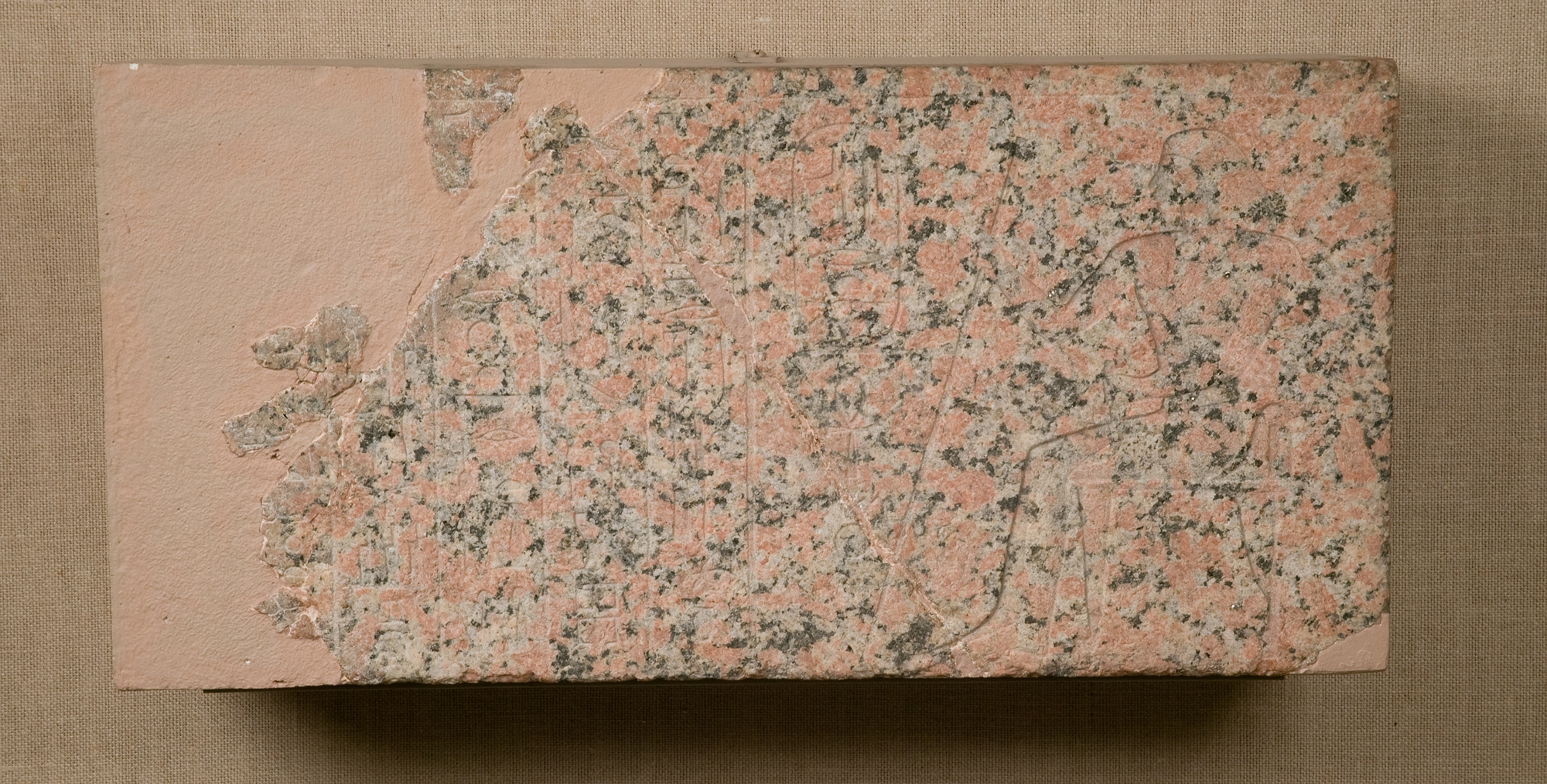
- Lintel of Senewosret-Ankh
Egyptian name
< F12 s D21 t z n > S34
- Dynasty: 12th Dynasty
- Pharaoh: Senusret I?
- Burial: Mastaba at Lisht
- Father: Sehetepibre-Ankh

Senewosret-Ankh (or Sesostris-Ankh, Senusret-Ankh; fl. c. 1950 BC) was High Priest of Ptah in Memphis, Royal Sculptor, and Builder likely during the time of Senusret I of the 12th Dynasty.

His mastaba was discovered in 1933 near the pyramid of Senusret I at Lisht. The tomb's superstructure was thoroughly destroyed because the stones had been removed. The tomb was looted in antiquity, but some nice pieces of sculpture were found by the excavators, like a limestone sitting statue of Senewosret-Ankh himself, now at the Metropolitan Museum of Art (acc. no. 33.1.2a–c). The walls of the burial chamber were decorated with Pyramid Texts.
