= Raymond O. Faulkner =

English Egyptologist and philologist

- Born: 26 December 1894; Shoreham-by-Sea, Sussex, UK
- Died: 3 March 1982 (aged 87); Ipswich, Suffolk, UK
- Education: University College London, University of London
- Known for: His dictionary of Middle Egyptian and translations of ancient Egyptian texts
- Scientific career
- Fields: Egyptology, philology
- Workplaces: Egypt Exploration Society, Fellow of the Society of Antiquaries

Raymond Oliver Faulkner, FSA, (26 December 1894 – 3 March 1982) was an English Egyptologist and philologist of the ancient Egyptian language.

== Life ==
Raymond O. Faulkner was born in Shoreham, Sussex, and was the son of bank clerk Frederick Arthur Faulkner and his wife Matilda Elizabeth Faulkner (née Wheeler). He spent his childhood in the isle of Wight. In 1912 he took up a position in the British Civil Service, but his employment was interrupted by World War I, when he entered the armed forces. After a brief period of service, he was invalided out and rejoined the Civil Service in 1916.

Faulkner developed an interest in Egyptology, and in 1918 he took to studying Egyptian hieroglyphs in his spare time at University College London under the tutelage of Margaret Murray. In 1926 he became the full-time assistant to Alan Gardiner, from whom he received philological training and encouragement to publish his works on hieroglyphic texts.

He was the editor of the Journal of Egyptian Archaeology from 1946 to 1959, and wrote many books, articles, and reviews. In 1950 he was admitted as a Fellow of the Society of Antiquaries.

In 1951 Faulkner became an assistant in language teaching at University College London, progressing to become a lecturer in Egyptian language – a post he held from 1954 to 1967. He received his Doctor of Letters degree from the University of London in 1960.

Faulkner's main area of interest was Egyptian philology, and he made major contributions to Egyptology with his translations and indexes of many important ancient Egyptian texts, as well as his autographic dictionary of Middle Egyptian (which remains an important and standard reference for modern Egyptologists and students of the ancient Egyptian language).

He died in Ipswich, Suffolk, on 3 March 1982.

=== Personal life ===
He was interested in astronomy, philately, horse riding and sailing. He married in 1937.

== Selected bibliography ==
- Raymond O. Faulkner, "The Plural and the Dual in Old Egyptian", 1929.
- Raymond O. Faulkner, "The Papyrus Bremner-Rhind", 1933.
- Raymond O. Faulkner, Egypt from the Inception of the Nineteenth Dynasty to the Death of Ramesses III, fascicule 52 for the "Cambridge Ancient History", ISBN 0-521-04477-4, 1966.
- Raymond O. Faulkner, "The Ancient Egyptian Pyramid Texts", ISBN 0-85668-297-7, 1969. Oxford University hardcover reprint ISBN 0-19-815437-2.
- Raymond O. Faulkner, "The Book of the Dead: Book of Going Forth by Day", ISBN 0-8118-0767-3, 1972.
- Raymond O. Faulkner and S. Glanville, "Catalogue of Egyptian Antiquities in the British Museum. Vol.II: Wooden Model Boats", ISBN 0-7141-0914-2, 1972.
- Raymond O. Faulkner, "A Concise Dictionary of Middle Egyptian", ISBN 0-900416-32-7, 1962, 2nd ed. 1972.
- Raymond O. Faulkner, "The Ancient Egyptian Coffin Texts", ISBN 0-85668-754-5, 3 vols., 1972–78.
- William K. Simpson, E. Wente, and Raymond O. Faulkner, "The Literature of Ancient Egypt", ISBN 0-300-01687-5, 1969.

== See also ==
- List of Egyptologists
