= Serdab =

Chamber in ancient Egyptian pyramids

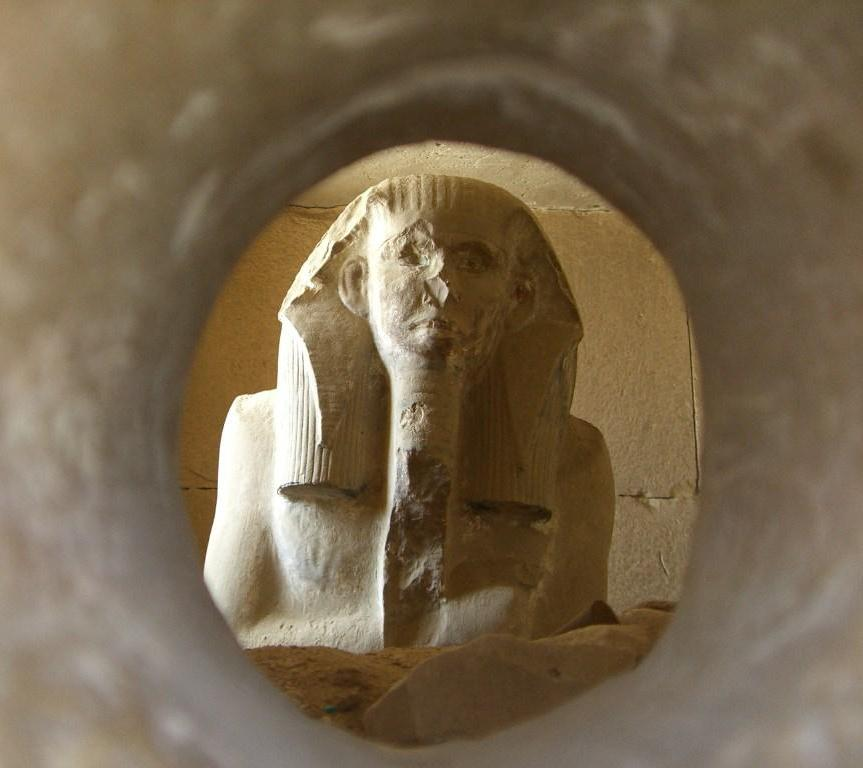
The pharaoh Djoser's ka statue peers out through the hole in his serdab, ready to receive the soul of the deceased and any offerings presented to it.

A serdab (Persian: سرداب, romanized: Sardāb, lit. 'cold water'), which became a loanword in Arabic for 'cellar', is an ancient Egyptian tomb structure that served as a chamber for the ka statue of a deceased individual. Used during the Old Kingdom, the serdab was a sealed chamber with a small slit or hole to allow the soul of the deceased to move about freely. These holes also let in the smells of the offerings presented to the statue.

The term serdab is also used for a type of undecorated chamber found in many pyramids. Owing to the lack of inscriptions it has been impossible to determine the ritual function of this chamber, but many Egyptologists view it as a storage space, akin to the underground storehouses in private and royal tombs of the Second Dynasty. It is most easily recognized by its position in the east end of the pyramid's internal chamber system and the three niches in its outer wall. The earliest serdab of this type is found in the pyramid of Menkaure, but it was during the reign of Djedkare Isesi that it became a part of the standard pyramid layout.
