= Userkare =

Ancient Egyptian pharaoh

- Woserkare, Weserkare
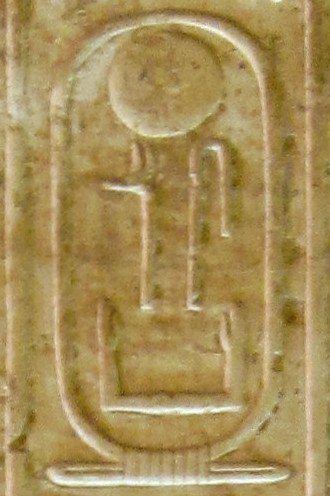
- Userkare's cartouche on the Abydos king list

Pharaoh
- Reign: 2 to 4 years, late 24th century BC (Note: Proposed dates for Userkare's reign: 2408 – 2404 BC, 2358 – 2354 BC, 2337 – 2335 BC, 2333 – 2332 BC, 2323 – 2321 BC, 2312 – 2310 BC, 2306 – 2302 BC, 2291 – 2289 BC, 2287 – 2285 BC, 2281 – 2277 BC, 2279 – 2276 BC, 2270 – 2265 BC.)
- Predecessor: Teti
- Successor: Pepi I
Royal titulary
Golden Horus
Conjectural:
Bikwy-nub
Bjk.wj-nb.w
The Two Golden Falcons
G5 G5 S12
Prenomen
Userkare
Wsr-k3-Rˁ
Powerful is the Ka of Ra< N5 wsr s kA >
- Father: Possibly Teti
- Mother: Uncertain, possibly Khuit II or Khentkaus IV
- Dynasty: Sixth Dynasty

Userkare (lit. 'Powerful is the soul of Ra'; also Woserkare) was the second king of the Sixth Dynasty of Egypt during the Old Kingdom Period. He reigned briefly, two to four years, in the late 24th or the early 23rd century BC. Userkare's relation to his predecessor Teti and successor Pepi I is unknown and his reign remains enigmatic.

Although Userkare is attested in some historical sources, that is they bear witness to his existence, he is not mentioned in the tomb inscriptions of Egyptian officials who lived during his reign and who usually report the names of the kings whom they served. The representations of some high officials of the period have been deliberately chiselled out in their tombs and their titles altered, for instance the word "king" being replaced by that for "desert". Egyptologists thus suspect that Pepi might have tried to erase all memory of Userkare from official records, monuments, tombs and artefacts. The Egyptian priest Manetho, who wrote a history of Egypt over 2,000 years later in the 3rd century BC, stated that Userkare's predecessor Teti was murdered, but is otherwise silent concerning Userkare. Consequently, some Egyptologists consider Userkare to have been a short-lived usurper to the throne. Alternatively, he may have been a legitimate short-lived ruler, the younger brother of a more ambitious Pepi I, or a regent who ruled during Pepi I's childhood before his accession to the throne.

The identity of Userkare's parents is conjectural and depends on whether he was legitimate or not. If he was, he could have been a son of Teti with one of his queens, possibly Khuit II or Khentkaus IV. If he was a usurper, he could possibly be a descendant of a cadet branch of the preceding Fifth Dynasty, as suggested by his name being constructed in the manner of the kings of that dynasty.

The tomb of Userkare has not yet been identified, either because it was never finished or because Pepi I erased traces of his predecessor's rule. If the tomb was indeed started, Egyptologists conjecture that it would be located in South Saqqara.

== Attestations ==
=== Contemporaneous sources ===
==== Secure attestations ====
Few artifacts dating to Userkare's lifetime have survived to this day, the only secure attestations contemporaneous with his reign being two cylinder seals, and an adze. (Note: The Egyptologist Peter Kaplony attributes three seals to Userkare but one of these seals reads "Userka[...]" and could instead belong to Userkaf. In addition, a number of seals bearing the name "Userkare" have been attributed to him but are now believed to belong to the 13th Dynasty pharaoh Userkare Khendjer, one of which is in the Brooklyn Museum.) The first seal is made of green-glazed steatite and bears the inscription "(The) good god Userkare, beloved by the gods (and) Hathor"; the second is of black steatite and shows Userkare's cartouche with the sun disk. The copper mallet from the Michaelides collection bears a small inscription giving the name of a crew of workmen "Beloved ones of Userkare" or "Userkare is beloved" who hailed from Wadjet the 10th nome of Upper Egypt, located around Tjebu south of Asyut. (Note: Kaplony's attribution of the mallet to Userkare in 1965 is accepted by Anthony Spalinger but differs from that proposed by Hans Goedicke in 1962. Goedicke instead reads the hieroglyphic signs on the objects to indicate that it belonged to Netjerkare.)

==== Possible attestations ====
The Egyptologists Michel Baud and Vassil Dobrev have also proposed that a copper axe head discovered in Syria could belong to Userkare. The axe bears the name of another crew of workmen called the "Beloved ones of the Two Golden Falcons", where "Two Golden Falcons" is the golden Horus name of a pharaoh. Although both Khufu and Sahure bore this name and either one of them may be the owner of the axe, Baud and Dobrev note that Teti's and Pepi's golden Horus names are "Golden Falcon who Unites" and "Three Golden Falcons", respectively. Given the role of the golden Horus name as a symbol of the transmission of royal powers in the Old Kingdom period, Dobrev proposes that the missing link between Teti's and Pepi's names is the name "Two Golden Falcons" and that it would logically correspond to Userkare's brief intervening reign. Consequently the axe would be an attestation of his rule.

Further attestations that may be of Userkare include an inscription on the architrave of the tomb of Mehi discussed in detail below; a block from Tanis bearing the cartouche "User[...]re", but which could equally well be attributed to Nyuserre; and, perhaps, a block inscribed with the cartouche "Uni" from Ezbet Rushdi near Tell el-Dab'a.

The Egyptologist Flinders Petrie has tentatively identified Userkare with a king named Ity attested by a single rock inscription found in the Wadi Hammamat. The inscription, dated to the first year of reign of Ity, mentions a band of 200 sailors and 200 masons under the direction of the overseers Ihyemsaf and Irenakhet sent to the Wadi Hammamat to collect stones for the construction of Ity's pyramid called "Bau Ity", meaning "Glory of Ity" or "The Bas of Ity". Petrie's identification of Userkare with Ity relies solely on his estimation of the inscription to the Sixth Dynasty and the fact that Userkare is the only king of this period whose full titulary is not known. As of 2025, this identification is at best deemed conjectural or completely rejected and several dates belonging to the First Intermediate Period (c. 2180 – c. 2050 BC) have been proposed for Ity.

=== South Saqqara Stone ===
In addition to the above attestations contemporaneous with Userkare's reign, details about his time on the throne were once given on the nearly contemporaneous South Saqqara Stone, a royal annal of the Sixth Dynasty dating to the reign of Merenre Nemtyemsaf I or Pepi II. It was uncovered by Gustave Jéquier in a storeroom of the mortuary temple of Iput II, northwest of the pyramid complex of Pepi II. (Note: The South Saqqara stone is now housed in the Egyptian Museum in Cairo under the inventory number JdE 65908.23.) The stone had been reused as lid for the sarcophagus of queen Ankhesenpepi III, though this lid did not originally belong with the sarcophagus.

An estimated 92% of the original text was lost when the stone was roughly polished, possibly in the late first intermediate to early Middle Kingdom period (c. 2050 – 1650 BC). The presence of Userkare on the annal can nonetheless be inferred from a large space between the sections concerning the reigns of Teti and Pepi I as well as from traces of a royal titulary in this space. Although the text reporting Userkare's activities is lost, its length suggests that Userkare ruled Egypt from two to four years, with the former seen as less probable than the latter.

=== Historical sources ===
Several ancient sources mention Userkare. The first is the Abydos king list, a list of kings written during the reign of Seti I (c. 1290 – 1279 BC), over 1,000 years after the early Sixth Dynasty. Userkare's cartouche occupies the 35th entry of the list, between those of Teti and Pepi I, making him the second pharaoh of the dynasty.

Userkare was possibly also listed on the Turin canon, a king list composed during the reign of Ramesses II (1279–1213 BC). However, a lacuna affects parts of the second line of the fourth column of the papyrus on which the list was written, the location where Userkare's name might have been located. If Userkare was indeed mentioned as Pepi I's predecessor, then what remains of his entry on the papyrus indicates that he was credited with 20 years of reign. This is now widely considered untenable because of evidence from the South Saqqara stone.

== Reign ==
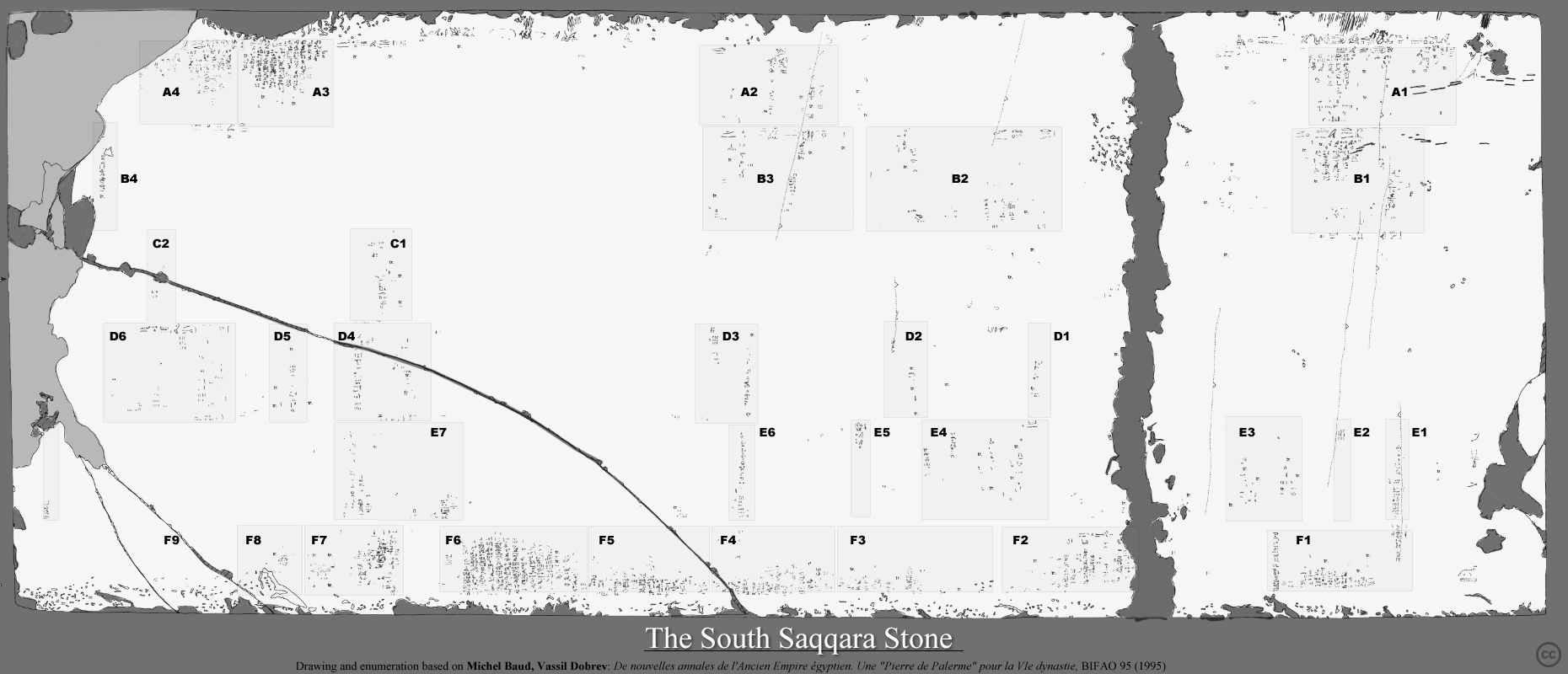
The South Saqqara Stone, the royal annals of the Sixth Dynasty, which detailed Userkare's reign in what is now an illegible section of its text

The consensus among modern Egyptologists is that Userkare reigned between Teti and Pepi I during the early Sixth Dynasty. For Michel Baud, the absence of monuments as well as the scarcity of artefacts and documents pertaining to Userkare all point to the short duration of his reign. (Note: Most Egyptologists propose a short reign for Userkare. An exception is Hans Goedicke. By attempting to reconcile conflicting data from historical sources, he proposed that Userkare reigned over the North of Egypt while Pepi reigned concurrently over the South. In this view Userkare ruled for between 20 and 33 years. To support this, he points to an inscription dated to the "Year after the fifth cattle count" of an uncertain king of the Sixth Dynasty as belonging to Userkare. Since this count was biennial prior to Pepi II's reign, this could correspond to Userkare's tenth year on the throne. The inscription has been ascribed to Pepi II by Osing.)

For the same reasons, his relations to his predecessor and successor are largely uncertain, consequently, Egyptologists have proposed a number of hypotheses regarding his identity and the nature of his rule. These fall broadly into two contradictory scenarios: one that sees Userkare as a legitimate ruler or regent, while the other perceives Userkare as a usurper, possibly responsible for the murder of his predecessor Teti. A minority opinion held by the Egyptologists Oleg Dmitrievich Berlev and Yury Perepelkin is that Userkare is not an independent ruler but rather a name of Teti.

=== As a legitimate ruler ===
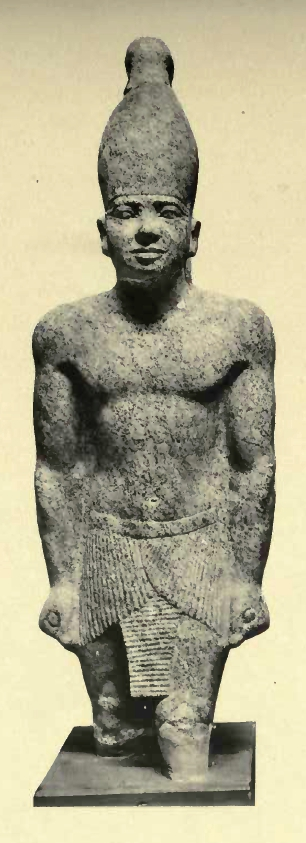
According to Manetho, Userkare's predecessor Teti was murdered.

The Egyptologists William Stevenson Smith, William C. Hayes and Nicolas Grimal believe that Userkare briefly ruled Egypt either as a legitimate stopgap ruler or as a regent with queen Iput I. Indeed, Teti's son Pepi I reigned for c. 50 years, indicating that he was probably very young at the death of his father, too young to immediately assume the throne. The theory that Userkare was merely a regent is rejected by Naguib Kanawati, on the basis that Userkare seems to have been mentioned on the Turin canon which otherwise lists only kings, is present in the Abydos king list and holds full royal titulary, something reserved exclusively to reigning pharaohs. In support of the hypothesis that Userkare was a legitimate stopgap ruler, Grimal stresses that he is well attested by historical and contemporaneous sources, in particular the South Saqqara Stone. This seems in contradiction with the idea that, being illegitimate, he was victim of a damnatio memoriae by his successor Pepi, whereby Pepi would have attempted to erase all memory of Userkare from official records. In addition, there is no direct evidence of difficulties associated with Pepi I's rise to the throne in the archaeological record, which one could expect had Userkare been a usurper. Rainer Stadelmann and Michel Baud stress that there is no clear evidence for a damnatio memoriae targeting Userkare. For example his funerary complex may have been planned yet never erected, which they find would provide a better explanation for its absence than a "speculative" attempt on Pepi I's behalf to erase traces of his predecessor's rule. Alternatively Userkare may have been legitimate yet only reigned jointly with Pepi I in a true coregency, although as the Egyptologist Christoffer Theis points out this hypothesis lacks direct evidence.

Vivianne Gae Callender—who thinks that Userkare was the target of some kind of damnatio memoriae—has put forth another theory in which Userkare was a legitimate son of Teti born while his father was king, but not his first-born son. In this hypothesis, Userkare's claim to the throne would rely on his being born after Teti had assumed power, while Pepi I would be the eldest son of Teti yet born before Teti's elevation to power. In particular Teti's eight to 12 years of reign would imply that Userkare would have been around 10 at the time of his coronation and facing a resentful older brother, possibly explaining the paucity of attestations of his rule. Morris Bierbrier goes even further by suggesting that the "ambitious" future pharaoh Pepi I might have had Userkare killed. Although not going as far, Karola Zibelius-Chen too thinks that Userkare was a legitimate son of Teti facing his half brother's opposition. She points in particular to the existence of two distinct queens of Teti bearing the title of "King's mother". One is Pepi's mother Iput while the identity of the second one is uncertain. For Zibelius-Chen and Callender she could well be the queen who later conspired against Pepi and was prosecuted when the conspiracy was discovered.

=== As a usurper to the throne ===
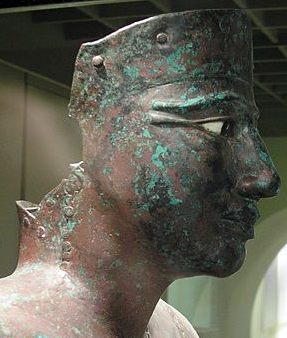
Teti's son, Pepi I, may have instituted a damnatio memoriae against Userkare.

The Egyptian priest Manetho wrote a history of Egypt, the Aegyptiaca, in the 3rd century BC during the reign of Ptolemy II (283–246 BC). No copies of the Aegyptiaca have survived, and it is now known only through later writings by Sextus Julius Africanus (c. 160 – 240) and Eusebius (c. 260/265 – 339). According to the Byzantine scholar George Syncellus (fl. 800), Africanus's version of the Aegyptiaca reported that Othoês—the Hellenized name of Teti—was murdered by his bodyguards or attendants. No other ancient source or archaeological evidence has come to light directly confirming this story. Based on the Aegyptiaca Egyptologists have found it plausible that Userkare participated in or at least benefited from Teti's assassination, despite Userkare's own absence from the Aegyptiaca. Userkare's name is theophoric and incorporates the name of the sun god Ra, a naming fashion common during the preceding Fifth Dynasty. Against this view, Theis observes that other kings of the Sixth Dynasty, Merenre and Pepi II—whose throne name was Neferkare—did include Ra in their names as well. Since Teti was not a son of the last Fifth Dynasty king Unas, some Egyptologists have proposed that Userkare could have been a descendant of a lateral branch of the Fifth Dynasty royal family who briefly seized power in a coup, and may even have reigned only over a small part of Egypt. In possible support of this theory is the discovery of stone blocks inscribed with Teti's mother Seshseshet's name reused as building material in the core of Pepi's pyramid. The reliefs of the blocks had been deliberately damaged and Verner proposed that Userkare may be responsible for this.

The Egyptologist Naguib Kanawati also finds the hypothesis that Userkare was a short-lived legitimate ruler or regent "unconvincing". Indeed, archaeological evidence lends credence to the idea that Userkare was illegitimate in the eyes of his successor Pepi I. In particular, there is no mention of Userkare in the tombs and biographies of the many Egyptian officials who served under both Teti and Pepi I. The viziers Inumin and Khentika, who served both Teti and Pepi I, are completely silent about Userkare and none of their activities during Userkare's time on the throne are reported in their tomb. Furthermore, the tomb of Mehi, a guard who lived under Teti, Userkare and Pepi, yielded an inscribed architrave—the lintel that rests on the capitals of columns—where the name of king Teti is written on a cut-out addition to the stone. For Kanawati this indicates that the name of Teti had originally been written on the architrave, was then erased to be replaced by that of another king whose name was itself chiselled out and replaced again by that of Teti on a replacement stone. Kanawati argues that the intervening name was that of Userkare to whom Mehi may have transferred his allegiance. As a result, Kanawati has argued that the evidence suggests that Mehi had switched his allegiance from Teti to Userkare and, following Pepi I's accession, attempted to realign with the legitimate royal line. In any case, Mehi's attempt to switch back to Teti was seemingly unsuccessful, as there is evidence that work on his tomb stopped abruptly and that he was never buried there. Rainer Stadelmann has contested Kanawati's reconstruction of the history of the inscription on Mehi's architrave, and Theis points to its unprovability.

A similar situation is encountered in the mastaba of Merefnebef, whom the Egyptologist Peter J. Brand qualifies as a "lowly" official and courtier who started his career under Teti then was elevated to the highest position, becoming vizier, in all probability under Userkare. The tomb exhibits distinct building phases, the latest one corresponding to Merefnebef's vizierate during which Merefnebef had his title inscribed repeatedly on the exterior of his tomb. Work on the tomb was then abruptly stopped, either with Merefnebef's death or with his political downfall following the death of Userkare. Later on, one of Merefnebef's sons intervened in the mastaba, chiselling out the representations of his father and brothers, altering his father's titles in particular those of "Honoured by the king" by erasing the word "king" or even replacing it with the word "desert". Finally the mastaba, left unfinished, was deliberately walled off so as to be hidden from sight. For the archaeologist Karol Myśliwiec who excavated the tomb, this shows that "the infamy of the most shameful moment in [Merefnebef's] career, that of being (probably) promoted to the function of vizier by the usurper Userkare, was visibly remembered for generations". This opinion is shared by Brand who sees here an instance of a wider pattern of promotion of low-ranking officials to the highest offices under Userkare, followed by their demotions or expulsions under Pepi I.

Michel Baud also sees difficulties with the idea that Userkare was fully legitimate: both he and Theis called the silence in contemporaneous private biographies "disturbing", with no official of the time period mentioning serving under Userkare. Furthermore, Baud and Vassil Dobrev do not see Userkare's presence on the South Saqqara Stone royal annals as evidence that he was legitimate in the eyes of his successors: it could be that royal annals and kings lists were not affected by damnatio memoriae measures, even those targeting usurpers, because their purpose was precisely to systematically record all royal names and activities, regardless of their political context. Conversely, for Theis, Userkare's presence on the annals makes it highly probable that he was a fully legitimate, albeit ephemeral ruler and there is insufficient evidence of a damnatio memoriae against him.

=== As a name of Teti ===
The Egyptologist Anthony Spalinger reports that Berlev and Perepelkin proposed that Userkare was in fact the prenomen of Teti, which they claim is unknown. They argued that an ancient scribe, redactor of royal annals added supplementary names to kings otherwise known to him by the same nomen, so as to distinguish them. This was the case for the nomen Teti which was that of Hor-Aha, Sekhemkhet and Teti. According to this hypothesis, the scribe added the prenomen "Userkare" to Teti's nomen, but this was interpreted by later Egyptians as referring to two distinct kings, ending up with two distinct cartouches on the Abydos king list. One piece of evidence that Berlev and Perepelkin use to support this theory was found in the pyramid of Khendjer (built c. 1750 BC) where an ancient graffito written during the reign of Ramses II (c. 1303 – 1213 BC) by a certain Nasui, wrongly refers to the pyramid as that of Teti. This confusion may be due to the fact that Khendjer's prenomen was Userkare and as proposed by Berlev and Perepelkin, perhaps so was Teti's. This hypothesis is generally rejected by Egyptologists such as Theis, who pointed out that Teti used the same name for both his prenomen and nomen, meaning they were identical, and that pharaohs of the previous Fifth Dynasty like Userkaf, Sahure, and Unas also had identical prenomens and nomens, and so Teti would have done the same.

== Parents ==
The identity of Userkare's parents cannot be established for certain owing to the lack of direct evidence and is thus tied to the hypothesis retained concerning his legitimacy. If he was legitimate, Userkare could have been a son of Teti, but the identity of his mother is very uncertain. Proceeding by elimination from the list of known Sixth Dynasty queens, Callender has conjectured that Userkare's mother was a queen bearing the title of "king's mother" mentioned in the mortuary temple of Pepi I and named "Kh[en]t[...]". For the Egyptologist Silke Roth "Kh[en]t[...]" is not a name but rather part of a title of the king's mother, possibly translated as "who is at the forefront[...]". It cannot be Pepi's own mother who is known to have been Iput I. For Wilfried Seipel the name could be fully rendered as "Khentitenka", while Theis, Dodson, Hilton and Bierbrier have proposed to read "Khentkaus". This could mean that Userkare's mother was Khentkaus IV, (Note: Dodson and Hilton call her Khentkaus III instead of IV as the tomb of a queen Khentkaus III of the preceding Fifth Dynasty was discovered after their book was published.) or that the inscribed block was reused and originally belonged to one of the Khentkauses of the preceding dynasty. Another possibility put forth by Janosí and Callender and agreed upon by Stadelmann, is that "Kh[en]t[...]" should be read "Khuit" and consequently should be identified as Khuit II.

== Tomb ==
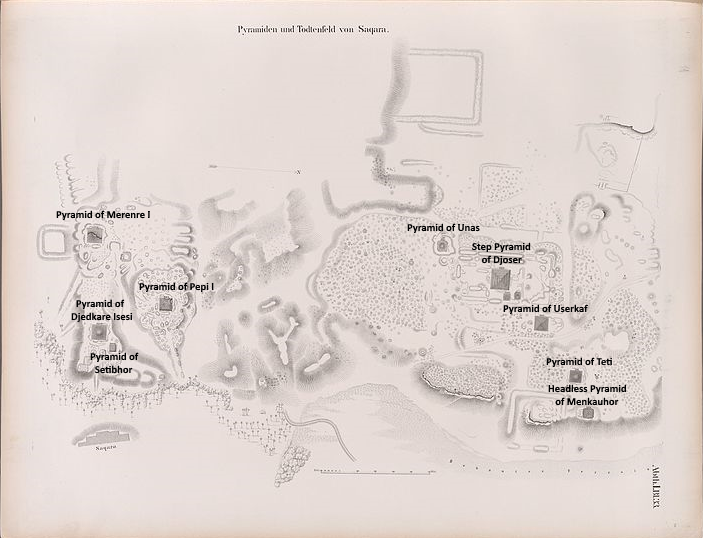
Map of South Saqqara by Karl Richard Lepsius

As of 2025, the location of the tomb of Userkare has not yet been identified. The brevity of his reign implies that the tomb was probably unfinished at his death, making modern identification difficult. Since Userkare was a Sixth Dynasty king, his tomb was presumably planned to be a pyramid. A possible vindication of this hypothesis is the copper mallet mentioning a team of paid workers from the nome of Wadjet. These workers were involved in an important building project, probably Userkare's pyramid.

Two hypotheses for the location of Userkare's pyramid have been put forth. The Egyptologists Vassil Dobrev and Miroslav Bárta proposed that Userkare's pyramid is located in the northern part of Saqqara South known today as Tabbet al-Guesh, north-west of the mortuary complex of Pepi I. Indeed, a large necropolis of Sixth Dynasty administration officials was uncovered there under the aegis of the Institut Français d'Archéologie Orientale. The necropolis comprises several large mastabas as well as two unfinished structures, one being 80 m × 80 m (260 ft × 260 ft), the other 60 m × 80 m (200 ft × 260 ft). According to Dobrev these could represent the start of a royal pyramid and its adjoining mortuary temple.

The astrophysicist Giulio Magli believes instead that the pyramid of Userkare is to be found midway between those of Pepi I and Merenre Nemtyemsaf I, at a place that would make the three pyramids form a line parallel to the one formed by the pyramid of Sekhemkhet, and those of Unas, Djoser, Userkaf and Teti to the North. As of 2015 no archaeological surveys had been carried out in this area to confirm or refute this hypothesis.

== Bibliography ==
- Adam, Shehata (1958). "Recent discoveries in the Eastern Delta (dec. 1950 - may 1955)". Annales du Service des Antiquités de l'Égypte. 55: 301–324.
- Adam, Shehata (1959). "Report in the excavations of the department of antiquities at Ezbet Rushdi". Annales du Service des Antiquités de l'Égypte. 56: 207–226.
- Allen, James; Allen, Susan; Anderson, Julie; Arnold, Dieter; Arnold, Dorothea; Cherpion, Nadine; David, Élisabeth; Grimal, Nicolas; Grzymski, Krzysztof; Hawass, Zahi; Hill, Marsha; Jánosi, Peter; Labée-Toutée, Sophie; Labrousse, Audran; Lauer, Jean-Phillippe; Leclant, Jean; Der Manuelian, Peter; Millet, N. B.; Oppenheim, Adela; Craig Patch, Diana; Pischikova, Elena; Rigault, Patricia; Roehrig, Catharine H.; Wildung, Dietrich; Ziegler, Christiane (1999). Egyptian Art in the Age of the Pyramids. New York: The Metropolitan Museum of Art. ISBN 978-0-81-096543-0. OCLC 41431623.
- Altenmüller, Hartwig (2001). "Old Kingdom: Sixth Dynasty". In Redford, Donald B. (ed.). The Oxford encyclopedia of ancient Egypt, Volume 2. Oxford University Press. pp. 601–605. ISBN 978-0-19-510234-5.
- Arnold, Dorothea (19 July 1999). "Old Kingdom chronology and list of kings". Metropolitan Museum of Art.
- Baker, Darrell (2008). The Encyclopedia of the Pharaohs: Volume I - Predynastic to the Twentieth Dynasty 3300–1069 BC. Stacey International. ISBN 978-1-905299-37-9.
- Bárta, Miroslav (2012), Journey to the west: the world of the Old Kingdom tombs in ancient Egypt, Prague: Charles University, Faculty of Arts, ISBN 978-8-07-308383-0
- Baud, Michel; Dobrev, Vassil (1995). "De nouvelles annales de l'ancien empire égyptien. Une "Pierre de Palerme" pour la VIe dynastie" [New annals from the Egyptian Old Kingdom. A "Palermo Stone" for the sixth dynasty] (PDF). Bulletin de l'Institut Français d'Archéologie Orientale (in French). 95: 23–92. Archived from the original (PDF) on 2 April 2015.
- Baud, Michel (2010). "The Old Kingdom". In Lloyd, Alan B. (ed.). A companion to ancient Egypt. Blackwell companions to the ancient world. Chichester: Wiley-Blackwell. pp. 63–80. ISBN 978-1-40-515598-4.
- Benderitter, Thierry; Hirst, Jon J. "Merefnebef". Osirisnet 2008-2023. Archived from the original on 18 April 2023.
- Berlev, Oleg Dmitrievich (1989). "Once more the tradition of king Userkare (VI dynasty)". Древний Восток (Drevnii Vostok) (in Russian): 56–63.
- Bierbrier, Morris L. (2008). Historical Dictionary of Ancient Egypt. Historical dictionaries of ancient civilizations and historical eras. Vol. 22 (2nd ed.). Lanham, Md.: Scarecrow Press. ISBN 978-0-81-086250-0.
- Brand, Peter J. (2002). "Review: Abusir and Saqqara in the year 2000 by Miroslav Bárta, Jaromír Krejčí". Journal of the American Research Center in Egypt. 39: 254–256. doi:10.2307/40001162. JSTOR 40001162. S2CID 191611152.
- Callender, Vivianne Gae (1991). "A contribution to discussion on the title of sƷt nṯr". Studien zur Altägyptischen Kultur. 18: 89–111. JSTOR 44325756.
- Callender, Vivianne Gae (2002). "Princess Inti of the ancient Egyptian sixth dynasty". Journal of Near Eastern Studies. 61 (4): 267–274. doi:10.1086/469041. JSTOR 3128942. S2CID 162296379.
- "Czech expedition discovers the tomb of an ancient Egyptian unknown queen". Charles University. January 2015.
- Clayton, Peter (1994). Chronicle of the Pharaohs. London: Thames & Hudson. ISBN 978-0-500-05074-3.
- "Cylinder seal bearing the name Userkere". Brooklyn Museum.
- Digital Collections, The New York Public Library. "(cartographic) Pyramiden und Todtenfeld von Saqara [Saqqârah]. (1849 - 1856)". The New York Public Library, Astor, Lenox, and Tilden Foundations.
- "Digital Giza, Userkare". Digital Giza. The Giza Project at Harvard University.
- Dobrev, Vassil (1993). "Considérations sur les titulatures des rois de la IVe dynastie égyptienne" [Considerations on the titulary of kings of the Egyptian sixth dynasty]. Bulletin de l'Institut Français d'Archéologie Orientale (in French): 179–204.
- Dobrev, Vassil (2006). "Old Kingdom Tombs at Tabbet al-Guesh (South Saqqara)". In Bárta, Miroslav; Coppens, Filip; Krejci, Jaromir (eds.). Abusir and Saqqara in the year 2005. Prague: Czech Institute of Egyptology, Faculty of Arts, Charles University in Prague. pp. 229–235. ISBN 978-8-07-308116-4.
- Dobrev, Vassil (2010). "Quest for the Lost Kings of Dynasty 6". In Raffaele, Francesco; Nuzzolo, Massimiliano; Incordino, I. (eds.). Recent discoveries and latest researches in Egyptology, conference proceedings. Wiesbaden: Harrassowitz. pp. 51–65. ISBN 978-3-44-706251-0.
- Dodson, Aidan; Hilton, Dyan (2004). The Complete Royal Families of Ancient Egypt. London: Thames & Hudson Ltd. ISBN 978-0-50-005128-3.
- Goedicke, Hans (1962). "Zur Chronologie der sogennanten "Erste Zwischenzeit". Mit 1. Abb" [On the chronology of the so-called "First Intermediate Period"]. Zeitschrift der Deutschen Morgenländischen Gesellschaft (in German). 112: 239–254. doi:10.25673/111210.
- Goedicke, Hans (1986). "Userkare". In Helck, Wolfgang; Otto, Eberhard; Westendorf, Wolfhart (eds.). Lexikon der Ägyptologie: Band VI. Stele-Zypresse [Lexicon of Egyptology: volume VI] (in German). Wiesbaden: Otto Harrassowitz. ISBN 978-3-44-702663-5.
- Goedicke, Hans (1988). "The death of Pepi II Neferkare". Studien zur Altägyptischen Kultur. 15: 111–121. JSTOR 44324580.
- Goedicke, Hans (1989). Old Hieratic Paleography. Baltimore: Halgo. ISBN 978-0-96-138054-0.
- Grimal, Nicolas (1992). A History of Ancient Egypt. Translated by Ian Shaw. Oxford: Blackwell publishing. ISBN 978-0-63-119396-8.
- Hayes, William (1970). "The Old Kingdom in Egypt". In Edwards, I. E. S.; Gadd, C. J.; Hammond, N. G. L. (eds.). The Cambridge ancient history, Vol. 1, Part 1. Cambridge: Cambridge University Press. pp. 178–179. ISBN 978-0-52-107051-5.
- Janosí, Peter (1998). "Reliefierte Kalksteinblöcke aus dem Tempel der 12. Dynastie bei Ezbet Rushdi el-Saghira (Tell el-Dabra)" [Relief-carved limestone blocks from the 12th Dynasty temple at Ezbet Rushdi el-Saghira (Tell el-Dabra)]. Ägypten und Levante (in German). 8: 51–81.
- Lauer, Jean-Philippe (1968). "Travaux et recherches à Saqqara. Campagnes 1966-67 et 1967-68" [Work and research at Saqqara. Campaigns 1966-67 and 1967-68]. Le Bulletin de la Société Française d'Égyptologie. 52: 15–27.
- Montet, Pierre (1933). Les Nouvelles Fouilles de Tanis (1929-1932) [New Excavations at Tanis (1929-1932)]. Publications de la Faculté des Lettres de Strasbourg. Vol. 10. Paris: Les Belles-Lettres. OCLC 502472194.
- Hayes, William (1978). The Scepter of Egypt: a Background for the Study of the Egyptian Antiquities in the Metropolitan Museum of Art. Vol. 1, from the Earliest Times to the End of the Middle Kingdom. New York: Metropolitan Museum of Art. OCLC 7427345.
- Hornung, Erik; Krauss, Rolf; Warburton, David, eds. (2012). Ancient Egyptian Chronology. Handbook of Oriental Studies. Leiden, Boston: Brill. ISBN 978-90-04-11385-5. ISSN 0169-9423.
- Kanawati, Naguib (2003). Conspiracies in the Egyptian Palace: Unis to Pepy I. London; New York: Routledge. ISBN 978-0-20-316673-4.
- Kaplony, Peter (1965). "Bemerkungen zu einigen Steingefäßen mit archaïschen Königsnamen" [Remarks on some stone vessels with archaic royal names]. Mitteilungen des Deutschen Archäologischen Instituts, Abteilung Kairo (in German). 20: 1–46.
- Kaplony, Peter (1981). Die Rollsiegel des Alten Reiches. Band II; Text A: Katalog der Rollsiegel. Text B: Tafeln [The cylinder seals of the Old Kingdom. Volume II; Text A: catalog of cylinder seals. Text B: plates]. Monumenta Aegyptiaca, 3B (in German). Bruxelles: Fondation Egyptologique Reine Élisabeth. OCLC 58642039.
- Krauss, Rolf (2021). "Late Old Kingdom chronology – another model". Ägypten und Levante / Egypt and the Levant. 31: 293–300. doi:10.1553/AEundL31s293. JSTOR 27153344. S2CID 245590988.
- Lloyd, Alan B., ed. (2010). A Companion to Ancient Egypt. Blackwell companions to the ancient world. Chichester: Wiley-Blackwell. ISBN 978-1-40-515598-4.
- Magli, Giulio (2010). "Archaeoastronomy and the archaeo-topography as tools in the search for a missing Egyptian pyramid". PalArch's Journal of Archaeology of Egypt/Egyptology. 7 (5): 1–9.
- Malek, Jaromir (2000). "The Old Kingdom (c.2160-2055 BC)". In Shaw, Ian (ed.). The Oxford History of Ancient Egypt. Oxford University Press. pp. 83–107. ISBN 978-0-19-815034-3.
- Myśliwiec, Karol (1999). "Meref-nebef: Berater des Pharaos" [Meref-nebef: Advisor to the Pharaoh]. Spektrum der Wissenschaft (in German). 12: 54–60.
- Myśliwiec, Karol (2007). "The Scheme 2 x 4 in the Decoration of Old Kingdom Tombs". In Hawass, Zahi; Richards, Janet (eds.). The Archaeology and Art of Ancient Egypt. Essays in Honor of David B. O'Connor. Volume II (PDF). Annales du Services des Antiquités de l'Égypte. Vol. cahier n°36. Cairo: Conseil Suprême des Antiquités de l'Égypte. pp. 191–205. ISBN 978-9-77-437241-4.
- Petrie, William Matthew Flinders (1907). A History of Egypt. Volume 1: from the Earliest Times to the XVIth dynasty (6th ed.). London: Methuen & co. OCLC 1524193.
- Rice, Michael (1999). Who is Who in Ancient Egypt. Who's who. London & New York: Routledge. ISBN 978-0-203-44328-6.
- Roth, Ann Macy (1991). Egyptian Phyles in the Old Kingdom: the Evolution of a System of Social Organization. Studies in Ancient Oriental Civilization 48. Chicago: The Oriental Institute. ISBN 978-0-91-898668-9.
- Roth, Silke (2001). Die Königsmütter des Alten Ägypten von der Frühzeit bis zum Ende der 12. Dynastie [The royal mothers of ancient Egypt from the early period to the end of the 12th dynasty]. Ägypten und Altes Testament (in German). Vol. 46. Wiesbaden: Harrassowitz. ISBN 978-3-44-704368-7.
- Seipel, Wilfried (1980). Untersuchungen zu den ägyptischen Königinnen der Frühzeit und des alten Reiches. Quellen und historische Einordnung [Studies on Egyptian queens of the early period and the Old Kingdom. Sources and historical context.] (PhD thesis) (in German). Hamburg: Universität Hamburg. OCLC 490075330.
- Sethe, Kurt (1905). Beiträge zur Ältesten Geschichte Ägyptens [Contributions to the earliest history of Egypt]. Untersuchungen zur Geschichte und Altertumskunde Ägyptens. Vol. 3. Leipzig: Hinrichs. doi:10.11588/diglit.13808. OCLC 1068651310.
- Spalinger, Anthony (1994). "Dated texts of the Old Kingdom". Studien zur Altägyptischen Kultur. 21: 275–319. JSTOR 25152700.
- Stadelmann, Rainer (1994). "König Teti und der Beginn der 6. Dynastie". In Berger, Catherine; Clerc, Gisèle; Grimal, Nicolas (eds.). Hommages à Jean Leclant. Volume 1. Études Pharaoniques [In honor of Jean Leclant. Volume 1. Pharaonic studies] (in French and German). Cairo: Institut Français d'Archéologie Orientale. pp. 327–336. ISBN 978-2-72-470137-1.
- Stevenson Smith, William (1971). "The Old Kingdom in Egypt". In Edwards, I. E. S.; Gadd, C. J.; Hammond, N. G. L. (eds.). The Cambridge Ancient History, Vol. 1, Part 2: Early History of the Middle East. Cambridge: Cambridge University Press. pp. 145–207. ISBN 978-0-52-107791-0.
- Stock, Hanns (1949). "Die erste Zwischenzeit Ägyptens. Untergang der Pyramidenzeit, Zwischenreiche von Abydos und Herakleopolis, Aufstieg Thebens" [The First Intermediate Period of Egypt: The fall of the pyramid age, the intermediate kingdoms of Abydos and Heracleopolis, and the rise of Thebes]. Analecta Orientalia: Commentationes Scientificae de Rebus Orientis Antiqui (in German). 31. OCLC 1521209250.
- Strudwick, Nigel C. (2005). Texts from the Pyramid Age. Writings from the Ancient World (book 16). Atlanta: Society of Biblical Literature. ISBN 978-1-58983-680-8.
- Theis, Christoffer (2015). "Userkare. Ein ephemerer Herrscher des Alten Reiches'" [Userkare. An ephemeral ruler of the Old Kingdom]. Sokar (in German). 30: 56–67.
- Verner, Miroslav (2002). The Pyramids: the Mystery, Culture, and Science of Egypt's Great Monuments. New York: Grove Press. ISBN 978-0-80-219863-1.
- von Beckerath, Jürgen (1999). Handbuch der Ägyptischen Königsnamen [Handbook of Egyptian Royal Names] (in German). Münchner ägyptologische Studien, Heft 49, Mainz : Philip von Zabern. ISBN 978-3-8053-2591-2.
- Waddell, William Gillan (1971). Manetho. Loeb classical library, 350. Cambridge, Massachusetts; London: Harvard University Press; W. Heinemann. OCLC 6246102.
- Zibelius-Chen, Karola (1990). "Politische Opposition im Alten Ägypten" [Political opposition in ancient Egypt]. Studien zur Altägyptischen Kultur (in German). 17: 339–360. JSTOR 25150160.

Preceded by Teti	King of Egypt late 24th century BC	Succeeded by Pepi I
