= Pyramid of Teti =

Smooth-sided pyramid in the pyramid field at Saqqara in Egypt

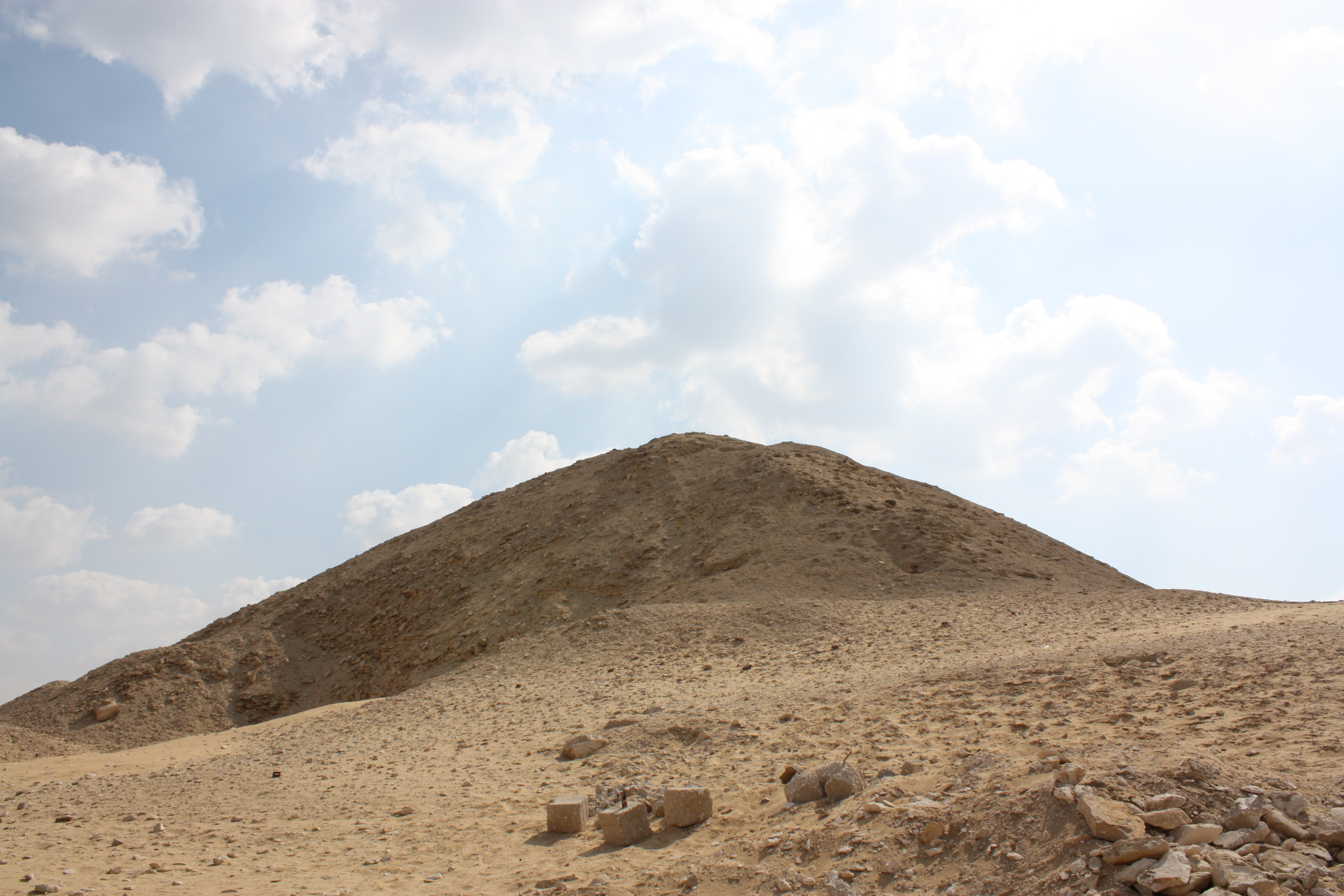

- Location within Egypt
- 29°52′31″N 31°13′18″E
- Owner: Teti
Ancient name
< X1 X1 M17 > R11 Q1 Q1 Q1 O24
Ḏd-jswt-Ttj
Djed-isut-Teti
"The Places of Teti Endure"
"The Pyramid which is Enduring of Places"
- Constructed: c. 2340 BC
- Type: Smooth-sided Pyramid
- Height: 52.5 m (172 ft; 100 cu)
- Base: 78.75 m (258 ft; 150 cu)
- Volume: 107,835 m^{3} (141,043 cu yd)
- Slope: 53° 07' 48"

The pyramid of Teti is a smooth-sided pyramid situated in the pyramid field at Saqqara in Egypt which belonged to Teti, founder of the sixth dynasty of Egypt. It is the second known pyramid containing Pyramid Texts. Excavations have revealed a satellite pyramid, two pyramids of queens accompanied by cult structures, and a funerary temple. The pyramid was opened by Gaston Maspero in 1882 and the complex explored during several campaigns ranging from 1907 to 1965. It was originally called Teti's Places Are Enduring. The preservation above ground is considered to be poor, and it now resembles a small hill. Below ground the chambers and corridors are in good condition.

== The funerary complex ==
The pyramid complex of Teti follows a model established during the reign of Djedkare Isesi, the arrangement of which is inherited from the funerary complexes of Abusir.

A valley temple, now lost, was probably destroyed in antiquity due to the placing of an Old Kingdom temple dedicated to Anubis there. A better known funerary temple, revealed by James Quibell in 1906, is connected to the valley temple by a causeway. The plan of the temple of Teti is also comparable to that of Unas, its immediate predecessor. Teti's temple has a somewhat special plan, however, due to a deviation of the floor which traditionally should have been located in the axis of the temple but here is moved south. It then accesses the temple through a hallway of the north–south facade joining the east–west axis of the monument. Followed in this main axis is a second hall. The thickness of the walls suggests a vaulted cover. It was probably the "Room of the Greats", on the walls of which the royal family and influential members of the court were to be represented assisting and accompanying the eternal journey of their sovereign.

Map of the Funerary Complex

This hall opened into an open courtyard surrounded on all four sides by colonnades whose main purpose was the presentation of daily offerings and ritual libations. The only way out is centered to the west and provides access to the innermost part the sanctuary.

Included in the Peribolos, a sacred part of the royal pyramid reserved for priests of the king, was a chapel containing the five Naos, housing five statues of the King appearing in the aspect of the five principal deities of the realm. This part also included a private room containing the false door stela of the King, a veritable object of funeral worship, and a double row of stores on both sides of the axis of the temple. The first row frames the party host and is accessible by a long corridor along the entire width of the building that leads to the south and north within the peribolos of the pyramid. The second set frames the sanctuary and the hall of statues of gods and was only accessible from the latter.

The last element essential to the funerary cult, the satellite-pyramid encircled in its own peribolos, is located southeast of the royal pyramid and therefore was accessible only through a corridor of stores and halls of worship. This small pyramid covers an underground plan consisting of a short ramp leading to a single underground chamber. In the middle of the courtyard of the paribolos, facing east and west, are two landscaped basins in the granite floor. Their use is disputed by Egyptologists, but the location of these basins, following the path of the sun, suggests ritual practices that shed some light on the role of this monument.

== The pyramid ==
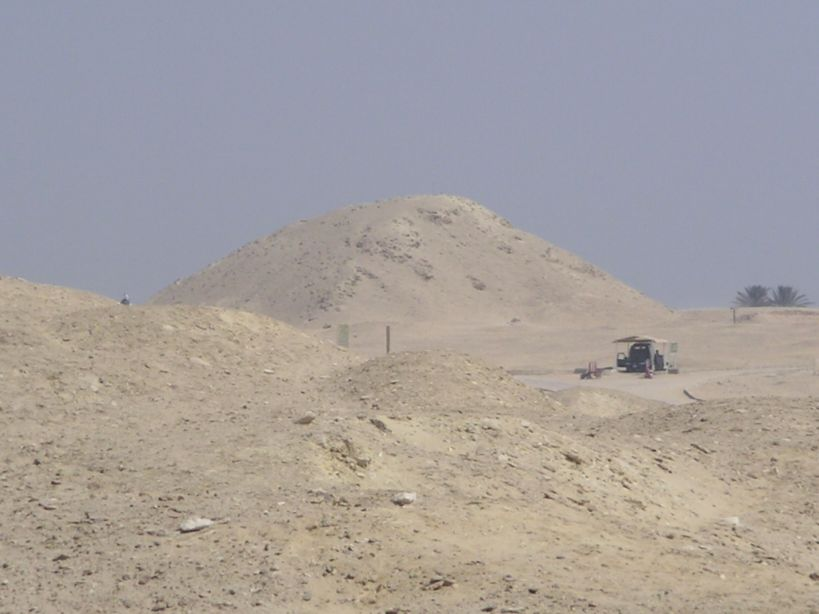
Pyramid of Teti

The orientation of the pyramid is not aligned with the four cardinal points. However, the proportions and plan of the pyramid follow exactly the same pattern as that of the pyramid of Djedkare Isesi. The internal dimensions and slope are the same and it is otherwise very similar.

Access to the burial chambers are located inside the adjoining chapel against the north face of the pyramid. The entrance hallway leads to a long descent of eighteen hundred and twenty-three metres. The entrance was once blocked by a plug of granite now lost. The descending passage was probably clogged along its length by large blocks of limestone that thieves have broken up. The debris still littered the passage at the time of discovery. In the descending corridor is a successive horizontal hallway, a vestibule, another hallway, a bedroom with harrows, a final corridor, and a final granite passage which opens into the funerary apartments of the King.

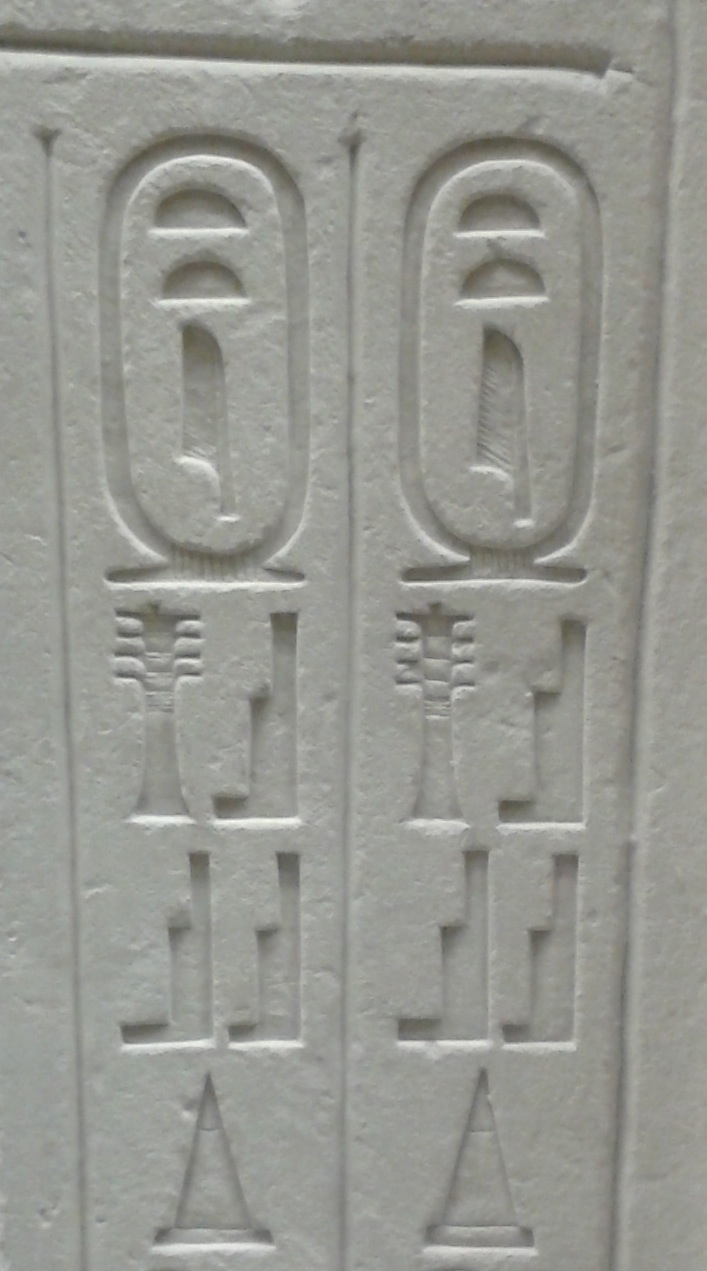
Name of the pyramid of Teti Djed-isut-teti on the limestone funerary stele of his chief treasurer Izi, from Saqqara. Musée du Louvre.

The room with harrows spans more than six metres and is designed with alternating limestone and granite. The three granite harrows, originally lowered, are now broken into several pieces leaving the way open to visitors.

The horizontal passage leads to rooms consisting of a funeral serdab, an antechamber, and a burial chamber. All three are aligned along an east–west axis. The only peculiarity of the serdab is the size of the block ensuring its coverage, measuring 6.72 metres long with a weight of forty tons. The antechamber and burial chamber are covered with huge vaulted rafters. They are connected by a passage where access was closed by a double door. The walls of these rooms are covered with hieroglyphic inscriptions commonly called the Pyramid Texts. The pyramid of Teti is the second royal monument to contain the complex theological corpus to assist and support the rebirth of the king.

The burial chamber had suffered the most damage, as tomb robbers apparently looking for hidden treasure had ripped out the north and south walls of the chamber, destroying some of the Pyramid Texts contained within. In recent years, the walls were reconstructed with small masonry, while the fragments of the original walls were dispersed to separate museums. Inside the burial chamber, an unfinished greywacke sarcophagus was found, alongside a fragment of a lid and a canopic container that is nothing more than a simple hole in the ground. And for the first time, a royal sarcophagus contains inscriptions, here slightly etched on the hollow interior of the vessel. The broken lid suggests that tomb robbers broke it to get access to the mummy of the pharaoh inside the sarcophagus.

Although looted since ancient times, remains of the king's grave goods were found during the first excavation of the monument. Consisting mainly of stone materials, these objects have been abandoned by looters, probably considered useless or worthless. Thus, a series of mace heads with the names of Teti has survived as well as one of the canopic jars that were meant to house the viscera of the king.

Another find at the pyramid-temple was the mould of a death mask which the excavators, working on the site in 1919, hypothesized was the face of either Teti or one of his wives and used as a reference for sculpting statues. However, this is first and foremost inconsistent with what is known about how statues were produced in Egypt at this time but the largest evidence against this hypothesis is the fact that the area around the pyramid was used as a cemetery for private individuals during Egypt's Graeco-Roman period. The usage of death masks, especially by the Romans, was a common and widespread practice in funeral processions, especially for the wealthy patrician class.

Teti's pyramid measures 78.5 meters per side at the base and the height is 52.5 meters. The Egyptian Royal Cubit is estimated at 525 mm which means each side of the structure measures 150 cubits at the base and gives it a height of 100 cubits. The core was a built in steps and accretions made of small, locally quarried stone and debris fill. This was covered with a layer of dressed limestone which has since been removed, causing the core to slump and crumble.

=== Pyramid Texts of Teti ===
The Pyramid Texts originally appeared in the Pyramid of Unas at the end of the Fifth Dynasty initiating a tradition that carried on in the pyramids of the kings and queens of the Sixth through Eighth Dynasty, until the end of the Old Kingdom. Due to damage by tomb robbers, Teti’s pyramid is missing the north and south walls of the burial chamber and antechamber and the walls of the entrance corridor, and thus the Pyramid Texts that were inscribed on them. What survived resembles those in Unas's tomb, but Teti’s pyramid is the first to use the monogram for ÿd-mdw, meaning “recitation”, at the top of each column as well as at the beginning of spells, something that later pyramids would incorporate in their Pyramid Texts. The Egyptologist James Allen identifies one of the more intact ritual text on the serdab (PT 229) and translated the following:

Raise yourself, father! You have your water, your have
your inundation, you have your milk from your mother Isis’s breasts.
Raise yourself, you who gave birth to Horus, you who gave birth to
him who is in Pe’s Seal-ring as Seth in Takhbit.
This great one has spent the night abed: awake, Teti!
Raise yourself! Receive your head,
collect your bones, and clear away your dust.
Sit then on that metal chair of yours and eat a foreleg, serve yourself a
shank, and feed on your ribs at the sky amongst the gods.

=== Interior photographs ===
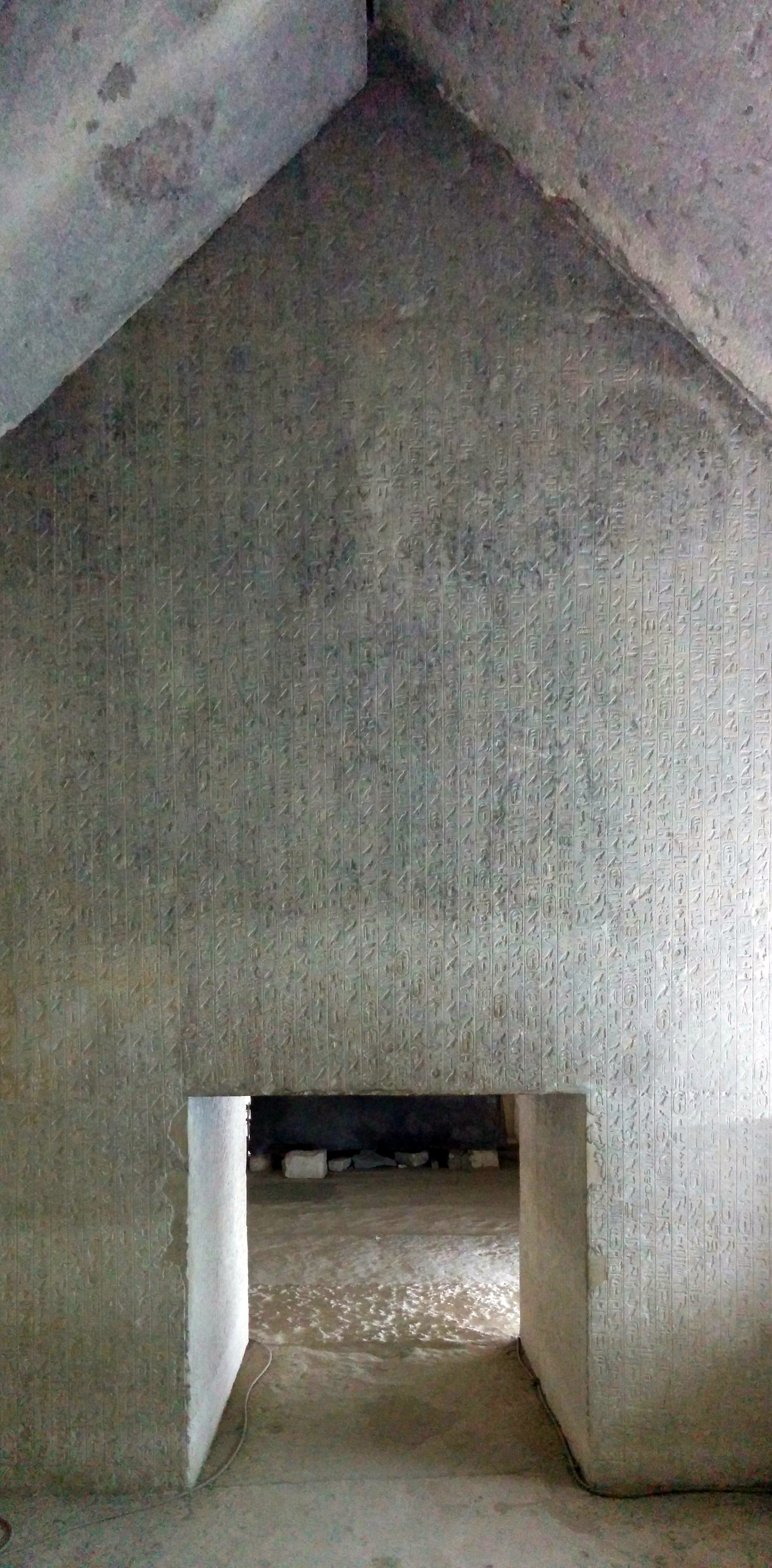
Interior

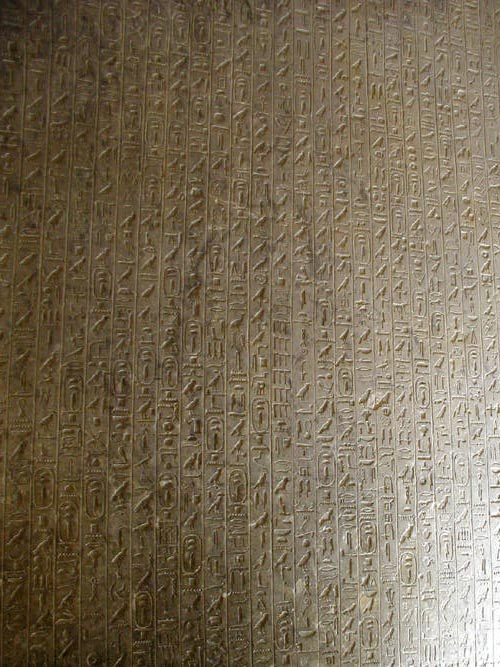
Engraved texts of the Burial Chamber

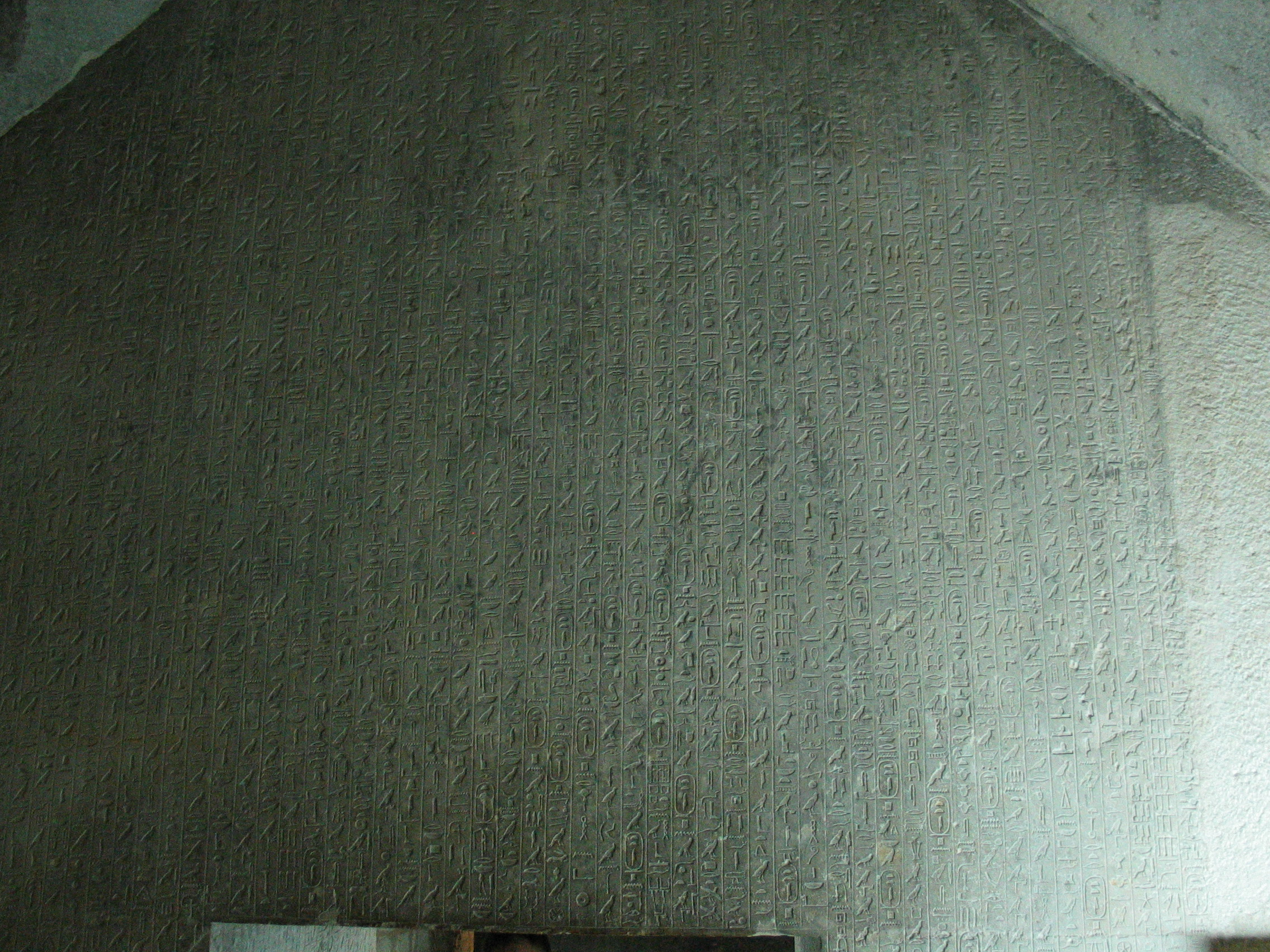
Another view of the Pyramid Texts in the antechamber of the pyramid of Teti

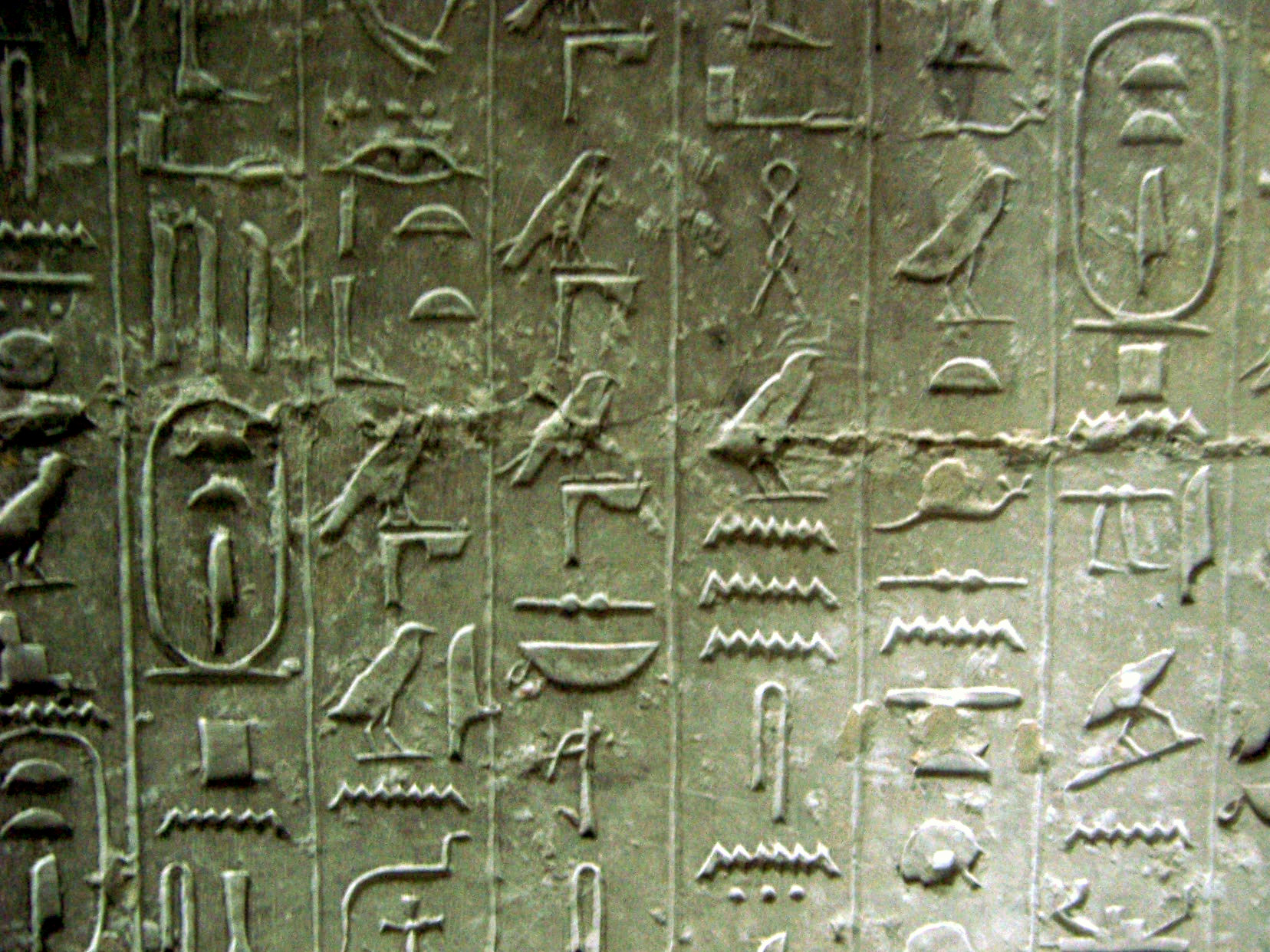
Detail with the cartouche of Teti

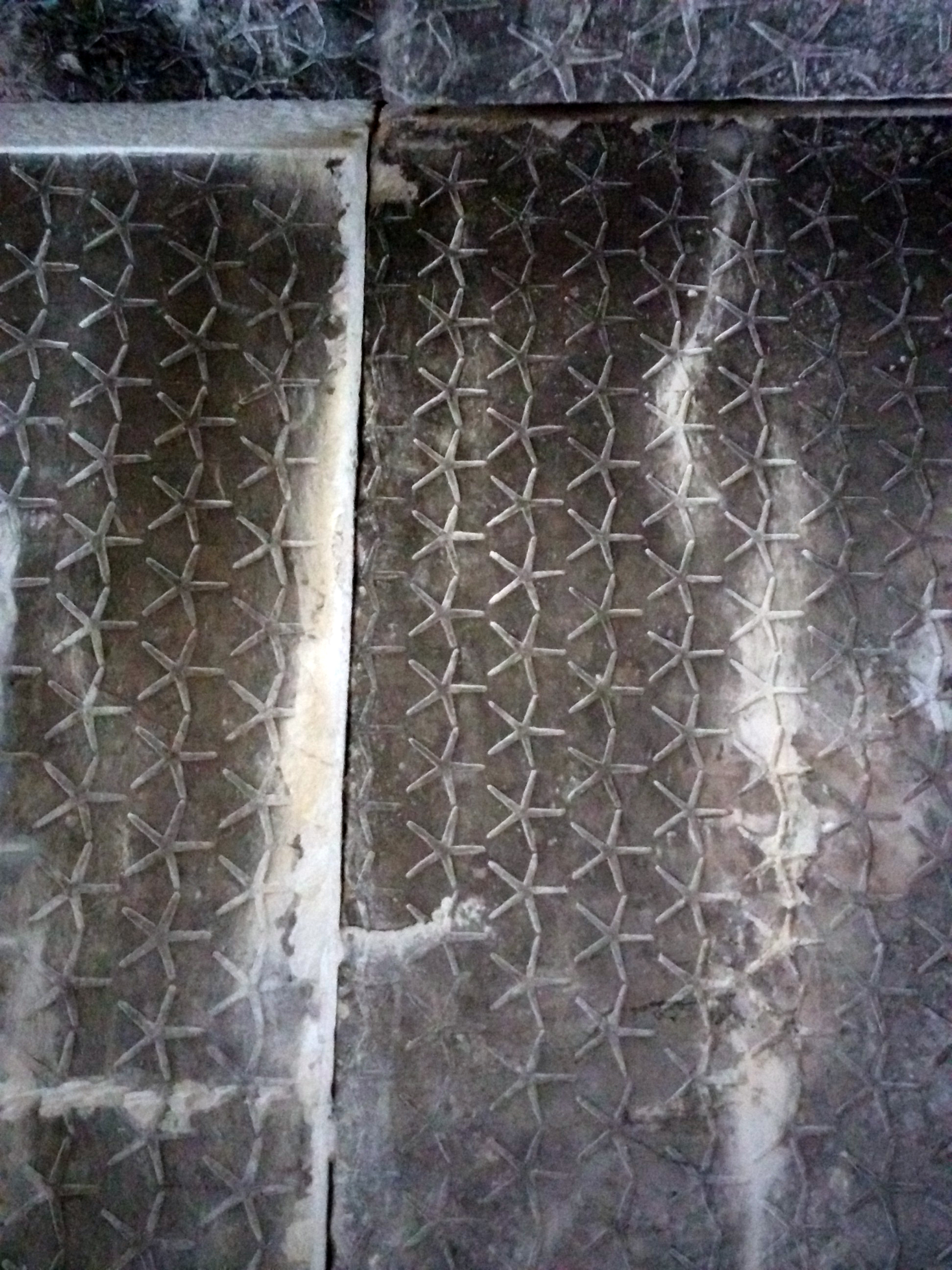
Starry ceiling

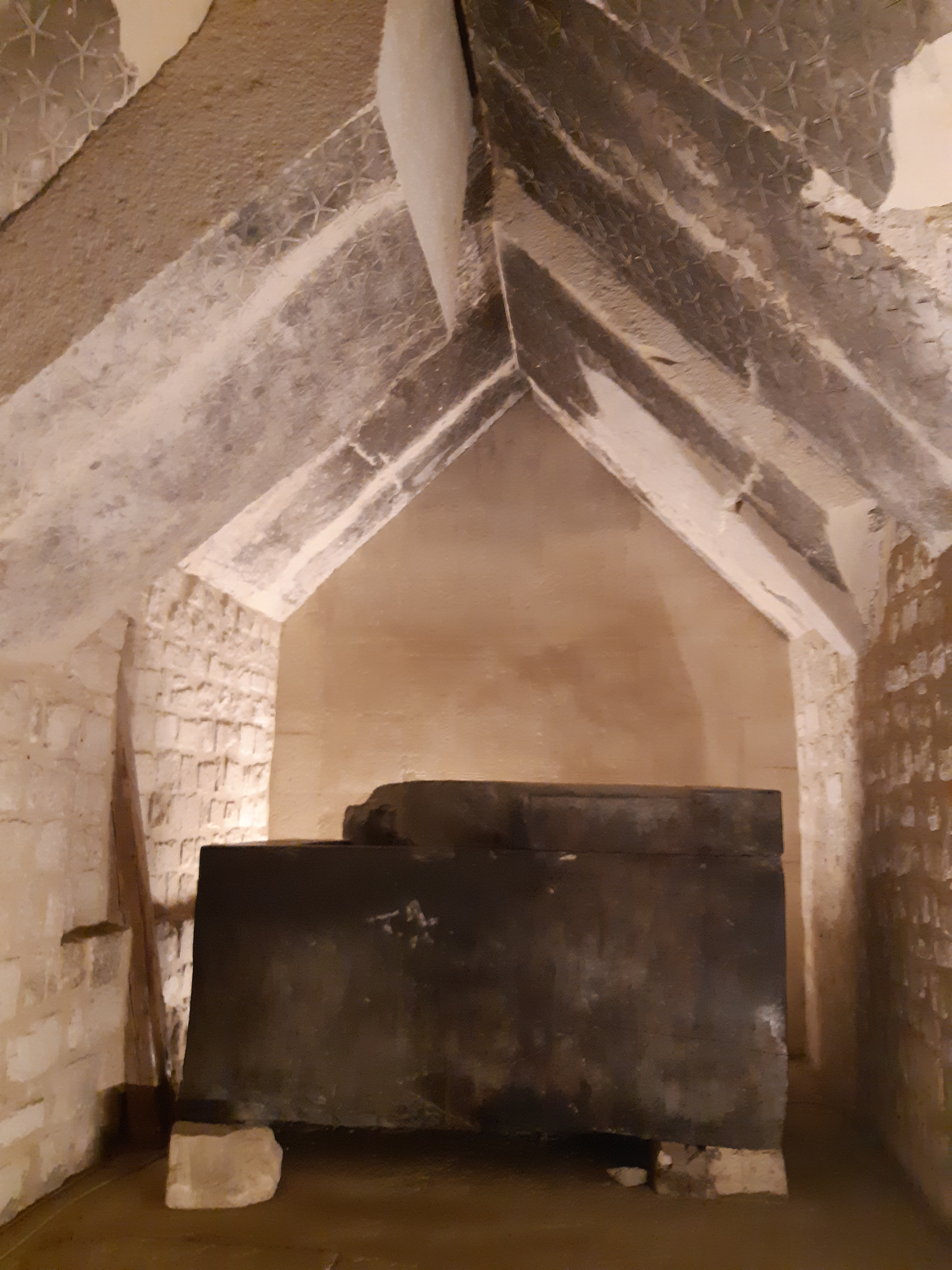
Burial chamber with reconstructed walls and the sarcophagus in the foreground

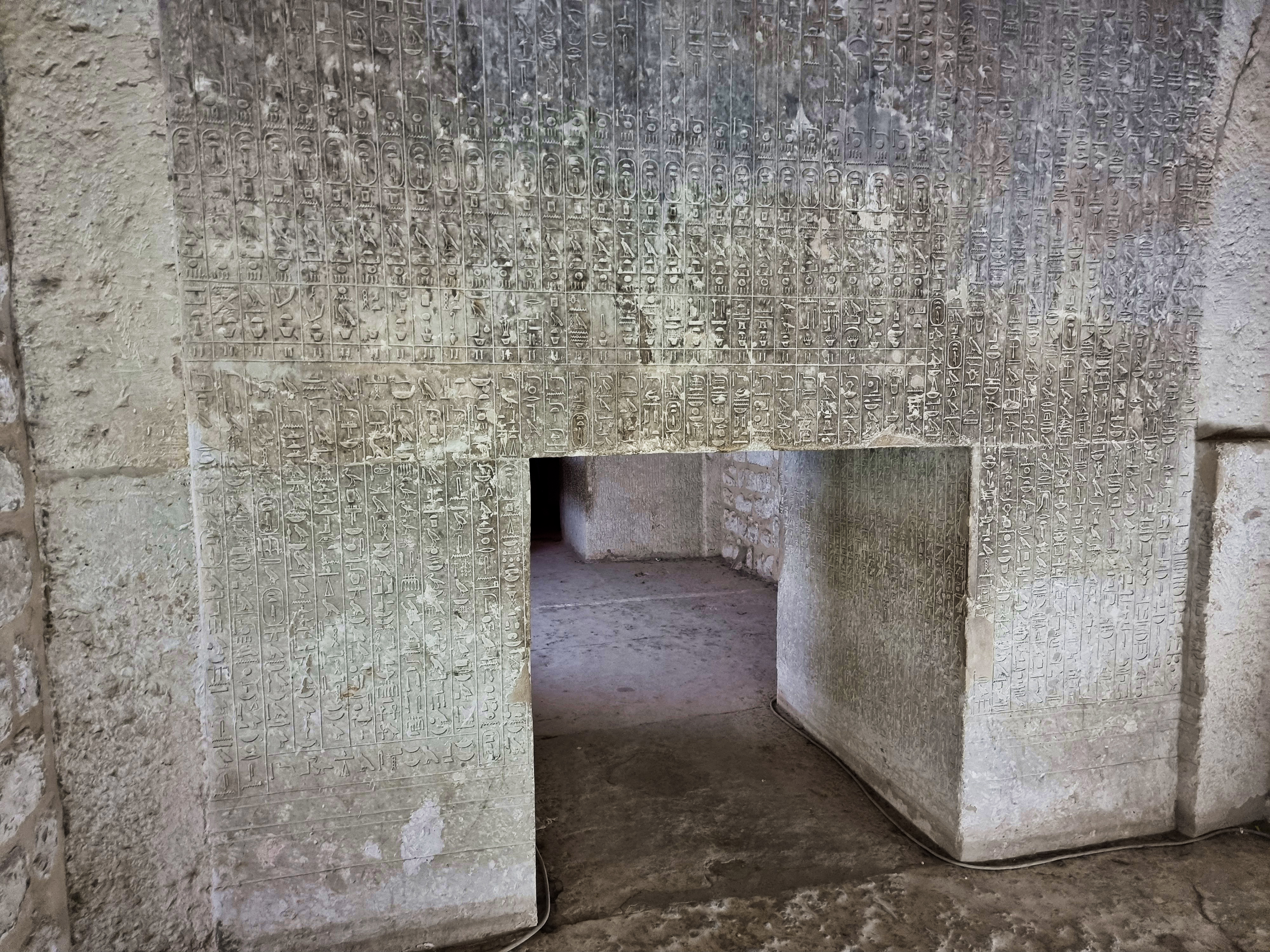
A surviving original wall from the Burial Chamber, containing the Pyramid Texts

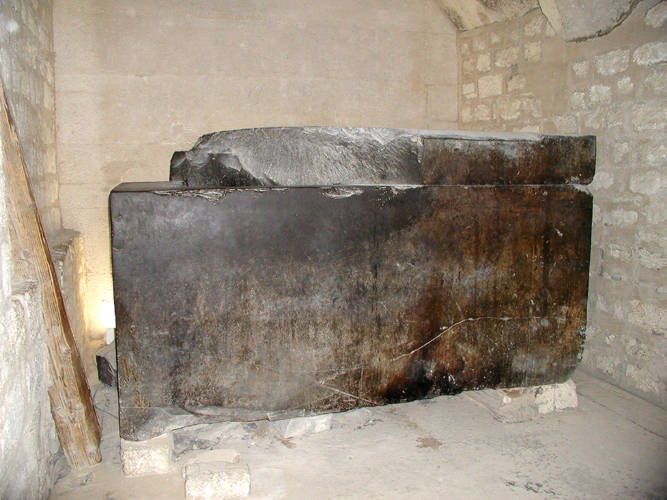
Sarcophagus of Teti with the broken lid

Interior of the sarcophagus of Teti

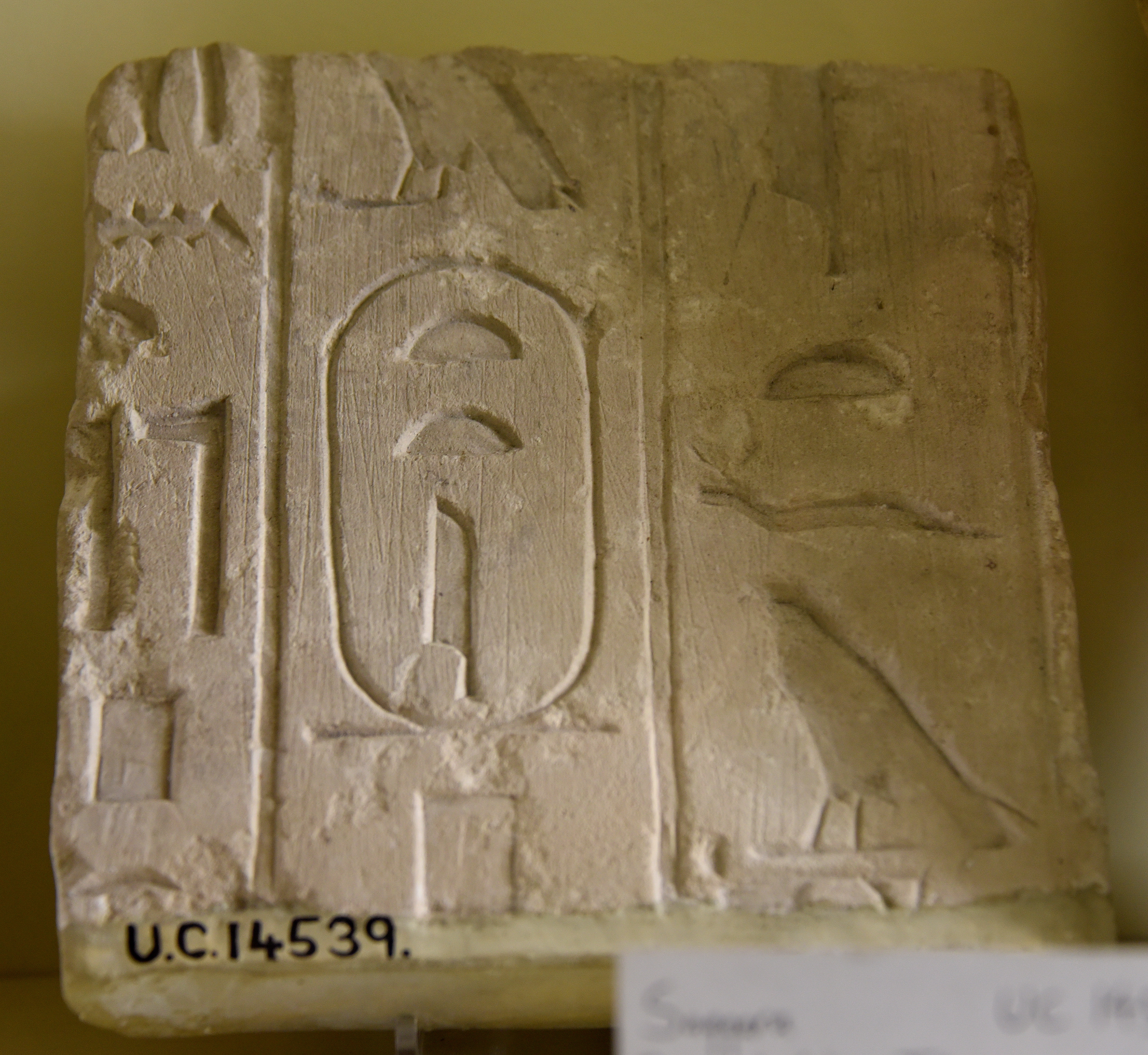
Limestone wall block fragment showing the cartouche of Teti and funerary Pyramid Texts. From the pyramid of Teti at Saqqara. Petrie Museum

== The Necropolis of Teti ==
All around the funerary complex of the king extends one of the richest parts of the necropolis of Saqqara. The king, whose destiny seems to have impressed his contemporaries, will be revered later as a divine mediator along with a few courtiers who have in some sense inherited it by reputation. The king was also accompanied by his two principal wives who each had a pyramid accompanied with a temple of worship.

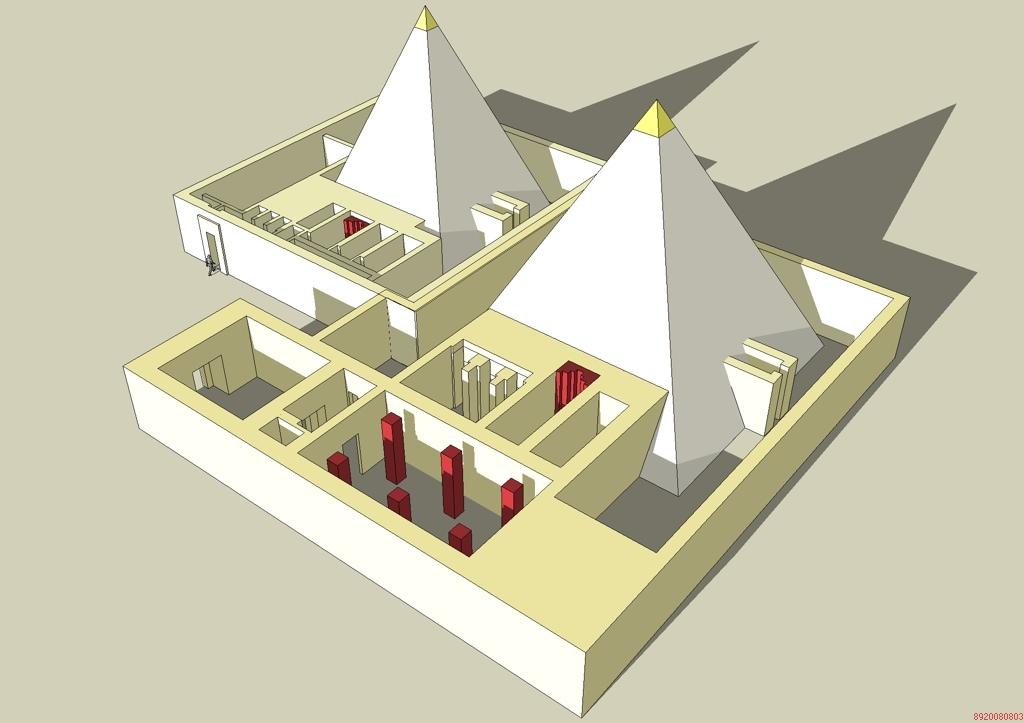
The pyramid complexes of the Queens of Teti, Khuit and Iput

Among the many tombs that form this necropolis of the Sixth Dynasty of Egypt include:

- The pyramid complex of Khuit II;
- The pyramid complex of Iput;
- The pyramid complex of Sesheshet I, the king's mother;
- The mastaba of Tetiankhkem, royal prince, son of Teti and Khuit;
- The mastaba of Kagemni, Vizier of Teti;
- The mastaba of Ankhmahor;
- The mastaba of Mereruka.

During the Middle Kingdom, the cult of the king was assured as evidenced by recent discoveries to the east of Teti's pyramid of the tombs of Sa-Hathor-Ipy and of Sekoueskhet (Sekweskhet). These were two priests attached to the worship of the famous pharaoh.

In the New Kingdom, other graves are arranged near the funerary complex of Teti, who is sometimes referred to as a true deity. Mose, a scribe, had his decorated tomb chapel here. Under the reign of Ramses II, Khaemwaset, the royal prince and High Priest of Ptah, would even restore the pyramid of the distant ruler, taking care to re-register his name on one side of his pyramid.

Finally, in the Late Period, popular enthusiasm for the gods of Saqqara increased to the point that a temple dedicated to Anubis is built on the funerary complex of Teti whose pyramid continued to dominate the entire valley and would remain a sacred monument to all the devotees who borrowed while along dromos leading to the Serapeum of Saqqara and which skirted the venerable pyramid of Teti.

== See also ==
- Egyptian pyramid construction techniques
- List of Egyptian pyramids
- List of megalithic sites

== Sources ==
- Baines, John; Málek, Jaromír (2000). Cultural atlas of Ancient Egypt. New York: Facts on file. ISBN 978-0-8160-4036-0.
- David P. Silverman, Middle Kingdom tombs in the Teti pyramid cemetery, Abusir and Saqqara in the Year 2000, Prague, 2000
- Cecil Mallaby Firth, The Teti pyramid cemeteries, Excavations at Saqqara, Egyptian Department of Antiquities, Cairo, 1926;
- Jean-Philippe Lauer & Jean Leclant, Le temple haut du complexe funéraire du roi Téti, Bulletin d'Études n°51, 1972;
- Sydney Aufrère & Jean-Claude Golvin, L'Égypte restituée, 1997;
- Jean-Pierre Adam & Christiane Ziegler, Les pyramides d'Égypte, 1999;
- Audran Labrousse, L'architecture des pyramides à textes, 2000.
- Hellum, Jennifer (2007). The Pyramids. Westport, CT: Greenwood Press. ISBN 978-0-313-32580-9.
- Lehner, Mark (2008). The Complete Pyramids. New York: Thames & Hudson. ISBN 978-0-500-28547-3.
- Verner, Miroslav (2001d). The Pyramids: The Mystery, Culture and Science of Egypt's Great Monuments. New York: Grove Press. ISBN 978-0-8021-1703-8.
