= Sesh =

Sesh, SESH, or sesH can refer to:

- Slang for session (disambiguation), multiple things
- Adivi Sesh (born 1984), an Indian actor, director, and screenwriter
- SESH, an American-Chinese program that uses crowdsourcing to improve health
- "Sesh" (Industry), a TV show episode that aired in 2020
- Sesheshet, an ancient Egyptian queen mother also known as "Sesh"

== See also ==
- Seche (disambiguation), meaning dry in French
