= Sessions =

Sessions may refer to:

- Sessions (surname), a surname
- Sessions (clothing company), an American apparel company
- Sessions Clock Company, an American clock manufacturer in the early 20th century

== Arts, entertainment, and media ==
- Sessions (Beatles album), an unreleased compilation album by The Beatles
- Sessions (Fred Neil album)
- Sessions (compilation series), a series of DJ mix albums released by Ministry of Sound
- Sessions (TV miniseries), a six-part 1991 HBO comedy miniseries created and produced by Billy Crystal starring Michael McKean and Elliot Gould
- Sessions (Descendents EP), a 1997 EP by the punk rock band the Descendents
- Sessions (This Condition EP)
- Sessions@AOL, a special avenue of programming conducted by AOL Music

== See also ==
- Session (disambiguation)
- The Sessions (disambiguation)
