= The Sessions =

The Sessions may refer to:

- The Sessions (2012 film), a film by Ben Lewin
- The Sessions (2020 film), a Nigerian romantic drama film
- The Sessions (album), an album by The Stranglers
- The Sessions (band), a Canadian band

== See also ==
- The Sessions Band, an American musical group
- Sessions (disambiguation)
