= Seche =

Seche, Sèche, or Séché can refer to:

- The words for dryness, to dry, or dried in French
  - Dry (disambiguation), several things
- Stephen Seche (born 1952), an American diplomat
- Léon Séché (1848 – 1914), a French poet
- Sèche Island, an island in Seychelles
- Rivière Sèche, a river in Martinique

== See also ==
- Sesh (disambiguation)
