= Teti =

Egyptian Pharaoh of 6th dynasty

- Statue of King Teti found near his pyramid at Saqqara; held at the Egyptian Museum of Cairo (JE 39103)

Pharaoh
- Reign: Around 12 years, c. 2345 - c. 2333 BC
- Predecessor: Unas
- Successor: Userkare
Royal titulary
Horus name
Hr Sehetep Tawy
Horus, he who satisfies/pacifies the two lands
G5	s Htp t p tA tA
Nebty name
Sehetep Nebty
He who satisfies/pacifies the two ladies
G16	s Htp t p
Golden Horus
Hr nebu sema
The golden Horus who unites
G8	F36
Prenomen
Teti
Of true greatness

M23 X1 L2 X1	t t i
Nomen
Teti
Of true greatness

G39 N5	t t i
- Consorts: Iput I, Khuit, Khentkaus IV, and Naert
- Children: Pepi I; Nebkauhor; Seshseshet; Seshseshet; Seshseshet; Seshseshet; Tetiankhkem; Seshseshet; Seshseshet; Seshseshet; Seshseshet; Seshseshet; "Queen of the West Pyramid"
- Mother: Sesheshet
- Died: c. 2333 BC
- Burial: Pyramid of Teti, Giza, Egypt
- Dynasty: 6th Dynasty

Teti, less commonly known as Othoes, sometimes also Tata, Atat, or Athath in outdated sources (died c. 2333 BC), was the first king of the Sixth Dynasty of Egypt. He was buried at Saqqara. The exact length of his reign has been destroyed on the Turin King List but is believed to have been around 12 years.

== Reign ==
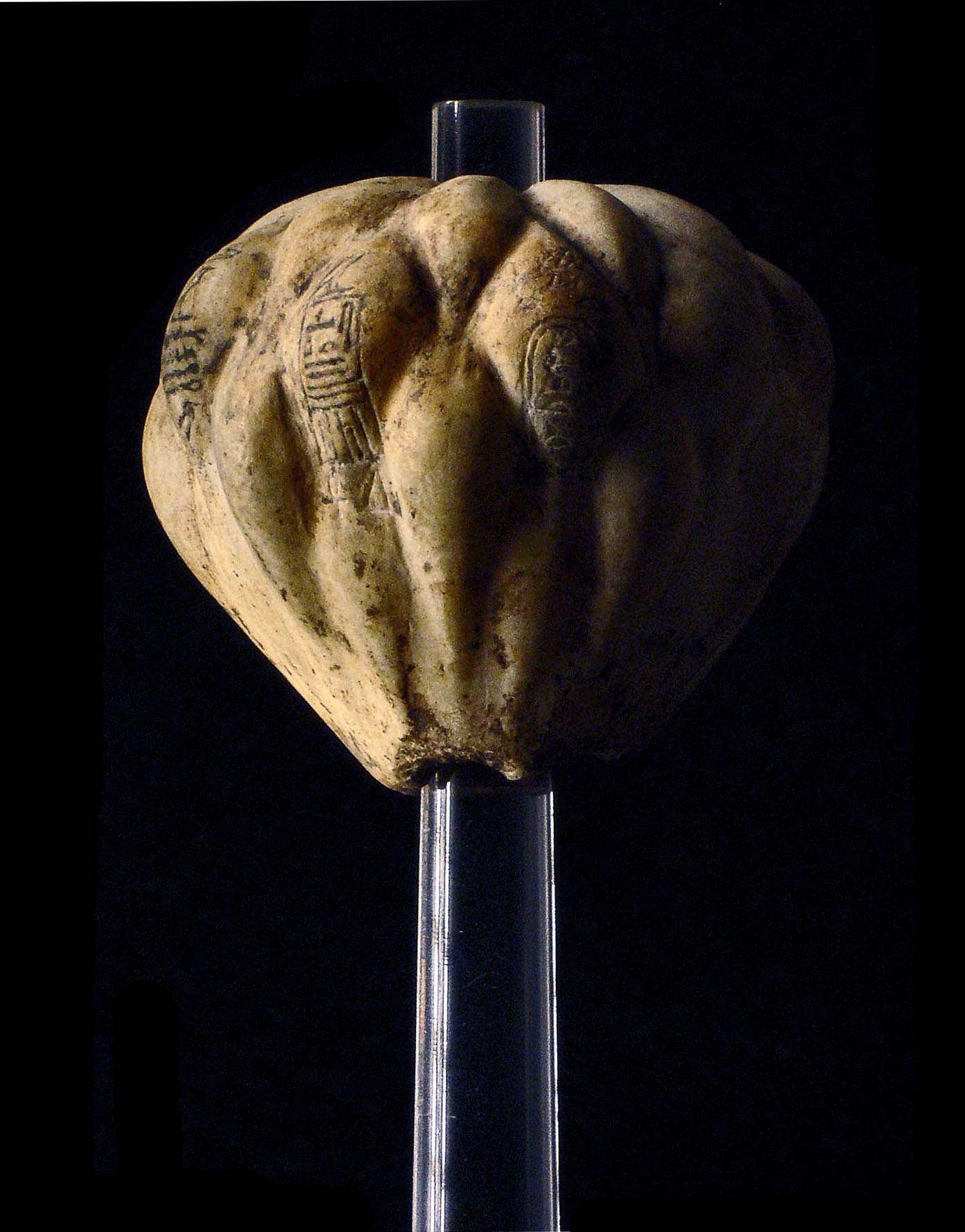
Piriform mace head inscribed with the cartouche of Teti, Imhotep Museum

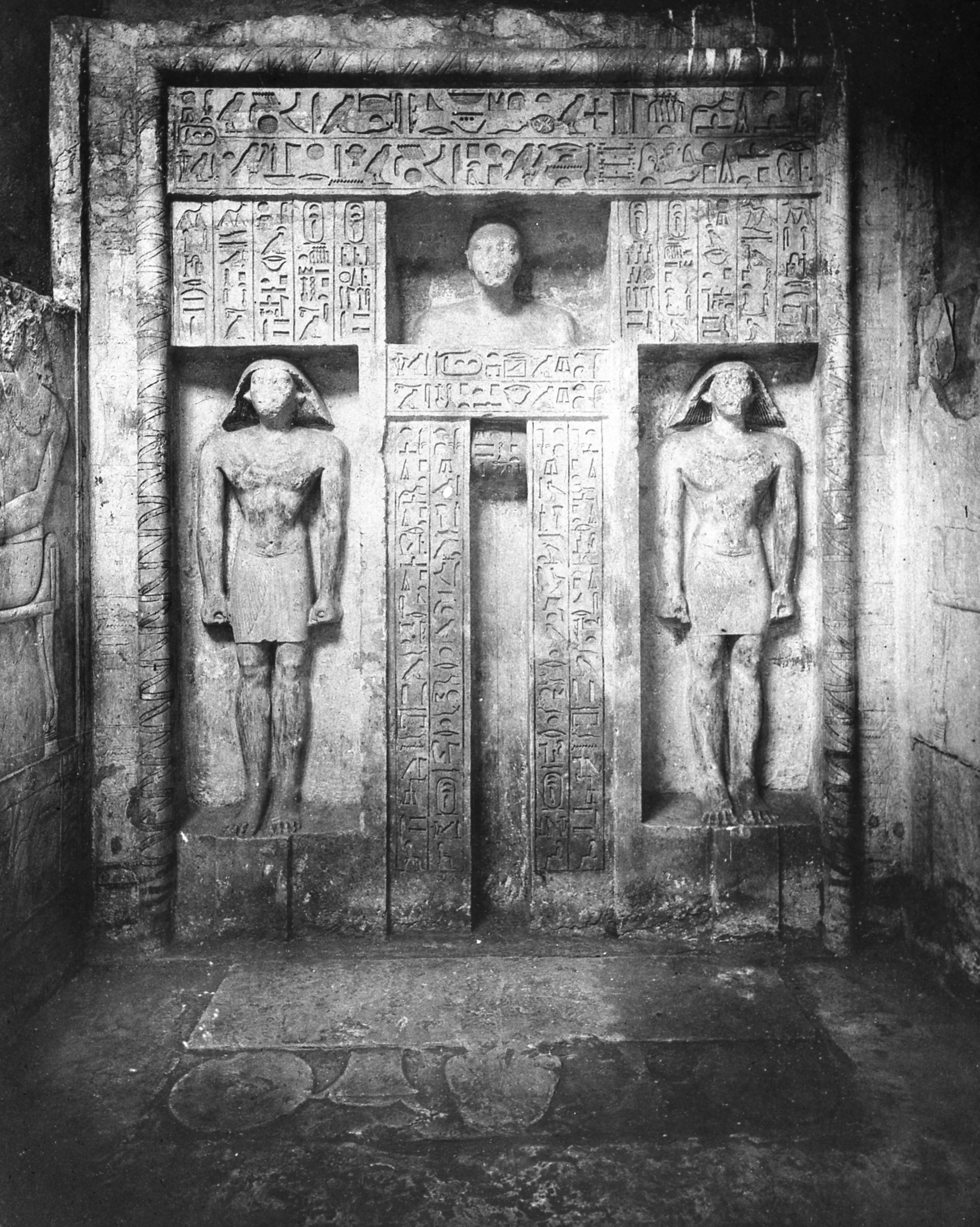
Lantern Slide Collection: Views, Objects: Egypt. Chapel, Tomb of Nefer-Seshem-Ptah. Sakkara. 6th Dynasty., n.d. Brooklyn Museum Archives.

Teti's Horus name Sehoteptawy, "He who pacifies the Two Lands", probably indicates that he must have led military pacification operations near the start of his reign. During Teti's reign, high officials were beginning to build funerary monuments that rivaled those of the pharaoh. His vizier, Mereruka, built a mastaba tomb at Saqqara which consisted of 33 richly carved rooms, the biggest known tomb for an Egyptian nobleman. This is considered to be a sign that Egypt's wealth was being transferred from the central court to the officials, a slow process that culminated in the end to the Old Kingdom.

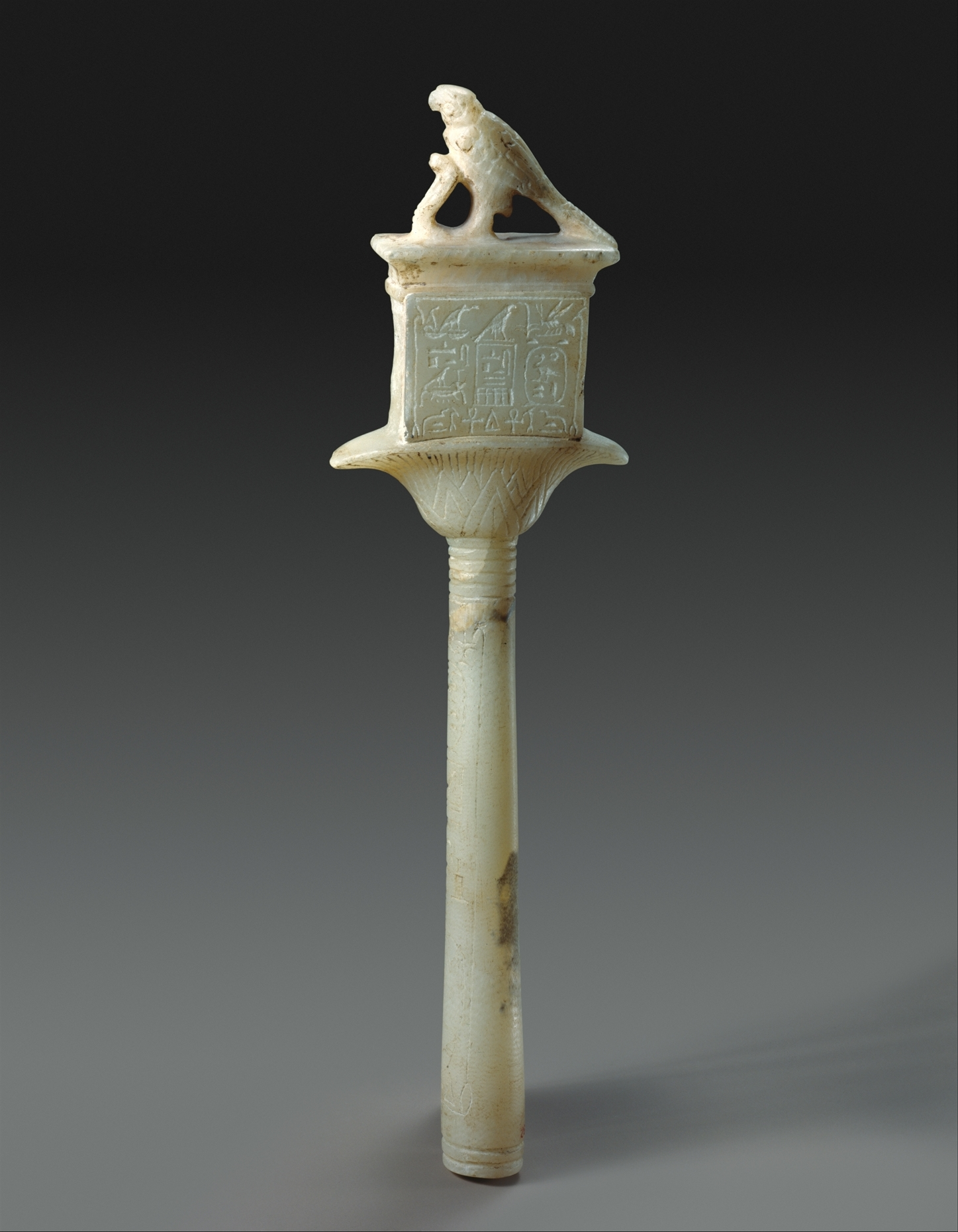
Sistrum inscribed with the name of Teti

=== Length of Reign ===
Teti's highest date is his "Year after the 6th Count 3rd Month of Summer day lost" (Year 12 if the count was biannual) from Hatnub Graffito No.1. This information is confirmed by the South Saqqara Stone Annal document from Pepi II's reign, which gives him a reign of around 12 years.

== Family ==
Teti had several wives:

- Iput, may have been a daughter of Unas, the last king of the Fifth dynasty.
- Khuit, who may have been the mother of Userkare (according to Jonosi and Callender)
- Khentkaus IV
- Naert

Teti is known to have had several children. He was the father of at least three sons and probably ten daughters. Of the sons, two are well attested, and a third one is likely.

According to N. Kanawati, Teti had at least nine daughters by a number of wives, and the fact that they were named after his mother, Sesheshet, allows researchers to trace his family. At least three princesses bearing the name Seshseshet are designated as "king's eldest daughter", meaning that there were at least three different queens. It seems that there was a tenth one, born of a fourth queen, as she is also designated as "king's eldest daughter".

=== Children with Iput ===
- Pepi I (died c. 2283 BC)
- Nebkauhor: With the name of Idu, "king's eldest son of his body", buried in the mastaba of Vizier Akhethetep/Hemi, buried in a fallen Vizier's tomb, within the funerary complex of his maternal grandfather
- Seshseshet Waatetkhethor: Married Vizier Mereruka, in whose mastaba she has a chapel. She is designated as "king's eldest daughter of his body". She may have been the eldest daughter of Iput.
- Seshseshet Idut: (died c. 2345 BC) "king's daughter of his body", who died very young at the beginning of her father's reign and was buried in the mastaba of Vizier Ihy.
- Seshseshet Nubkhetnebty: "king's daughter of his body", wife of Vizier Kagemni, represented in her husband's mastaba.
- Seshseshet Sathor: Married to Isi, resident governor at Edfu and also titled vizier.

=== Children with Khuit ===
- Tetiankhkem (c. 2350 BC – c. 2335 BC)

=== Possible children with Khuit ===
- Seshseshet, with the name of Sheshit: King's eldest daughter of his body and wife of the overseer of the great court Neferseshemptah and is depicted in her husband's mastaba. As she is the eldest daughter of the king, she cannot be born of the same mother as Waatkhetethor and therefore may have been a daughter of Queen Khuit.

=== Children with unknown spouse(s) ===
- Seshseshet, also called Sheshti: "King's daughter of his body", married to the keeper of the head ornaments Shepsipuptah, and depicted in her husband's mastaba.
- Seshseshet with the beautiful name of Merout: Entitled "king's eldest daughter" but without the addition "of his body" and therefore born of a third, maybe a minor queen, and married to Ptahemhat.
- Seshseshet: Wife of Remni, "sole companion" and overseer of the department of the palace guards
- Seshseshet: Married to Pepyankh Senior of Meir
- The so-called "Queen of the West Pyramid" in King Pepi I cemetery. She is called "king's eldest daughter of his body" and king's wife of Meryre (the name of Pepi I). Therefore, she is a wife of Pepi and most certainly his half-sister. As she is also an eldest daughter of the king, her mother was likely a fourth queen of Teti.

Another possible daughter is princess Inti.

== Death ==
The Egyptian priest and chronicler Manetho states that Teti was murdered by his palace bodyguards in a harem plot, and he appears to have been briefly succeeded by a short-lived usurper, Userkare.

=== Pyramid of Teti ===
Teti was buried in the royal necropolis at Saqqara. His pyramid complex is associated with the mastabas of officials from his reign.

=== Third "subsidiary" pyramid to Teti's tomb ===
Teti's mother was the Queen Sesheshet, who was instrumental in her son's accession to the throne and a reconciling of two warring factions of the royal family. Sesheshet lived between 2323 BC to 2291 BC. Egypt's chief archaeologist Zahi Hawass, secretary general of the Supreme Council of Antiquities, announced on 11 November 2008 that she was entombed in a 4,300-year-old 5-metre (16-foot) tall pyramid at Saqqara. This is the 118th pyramid discovered thus far in Egypt; the largest portion of its 2-metre-wide casing was built with a superstructure 5 metres high. It originally reached 14 metres, with sides 22 metres long.

Once 5 stories tall, it lay beneath 7 meters (23 feet) of sand, a small shrine and mud-brick walls from later periods. The third known "subsidiary" pyramid to Teti's tomb was originally 46 feet (14 meters) tall and 72 feet (22 meters) square at its base, due to its walls having stood at a 51-degree angle. Buried next to the Saqqara Step Pyramid, its base lies 65 feet (20 meters) underground and is believed to have been 50 feet (15 meters) tall when it was built.

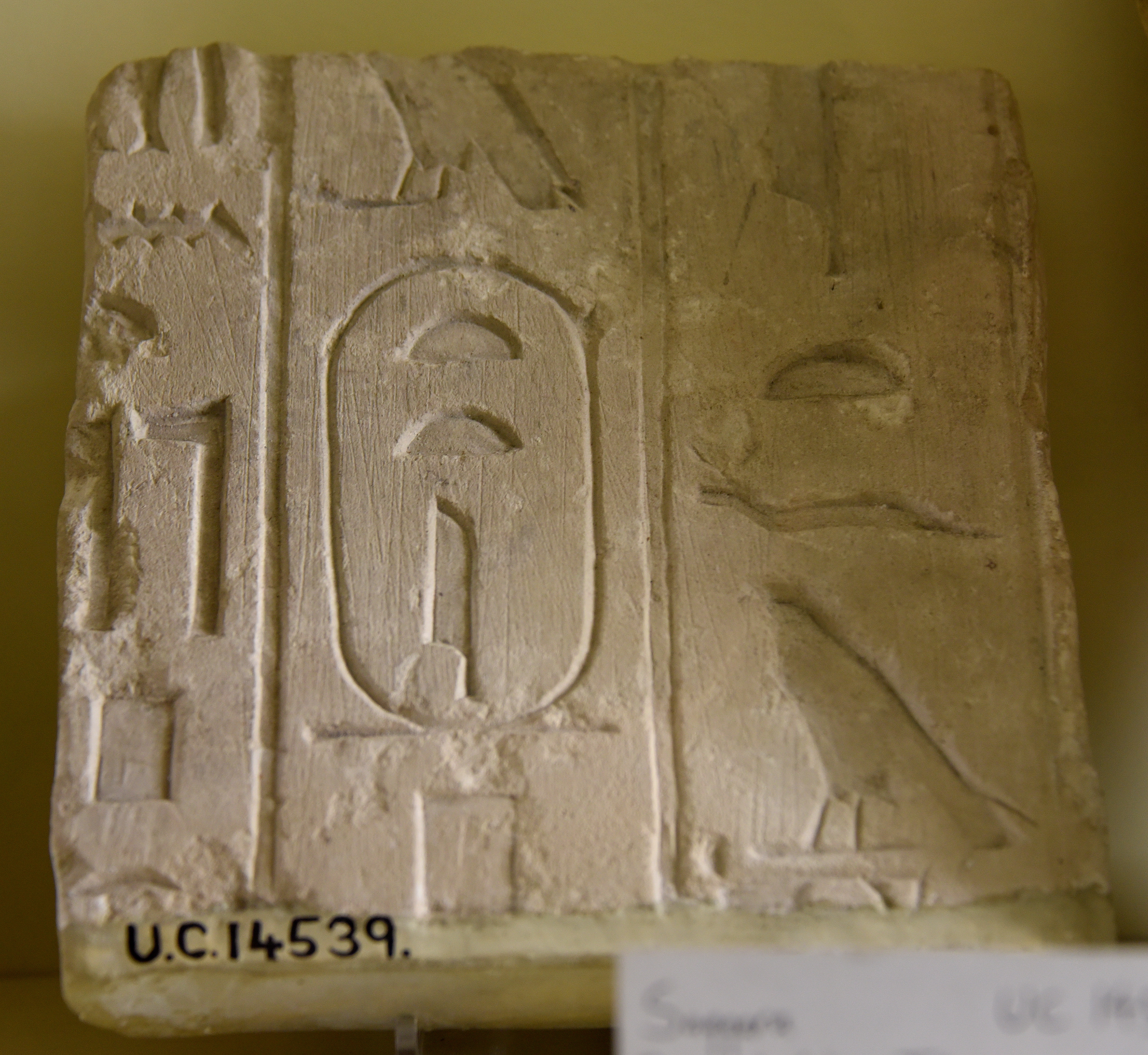
Limestone wall block fragment showing the cartouche of king Teti and funerary pyramid texts. The Petrie Museum of Egyptian Archaeology, London

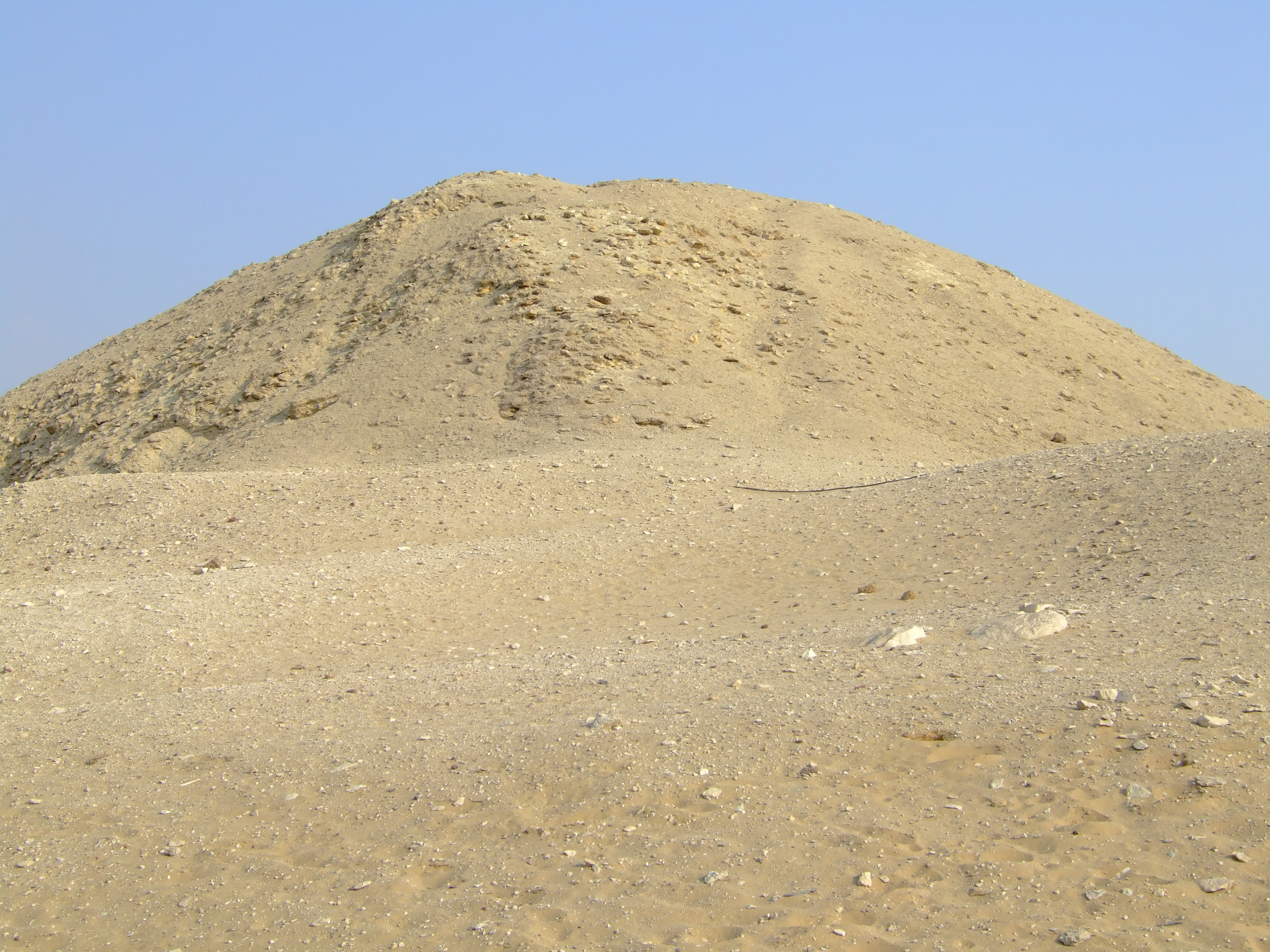
The ruins of Teti's pyramid (Saqqara)

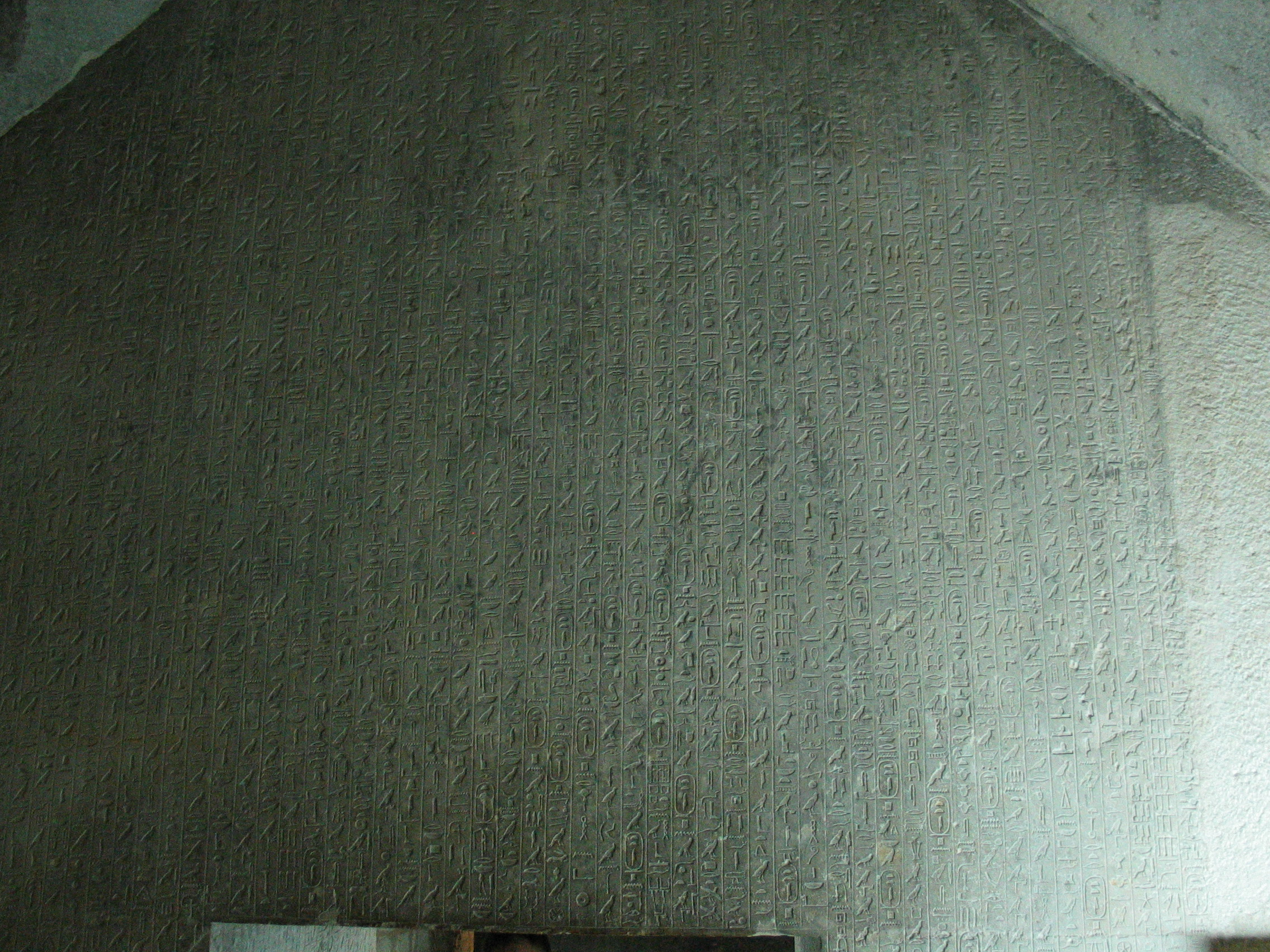
Pyramid texts from Teti I's pyramid at Saqqara

=== Funerary temple of Queen Neith ===
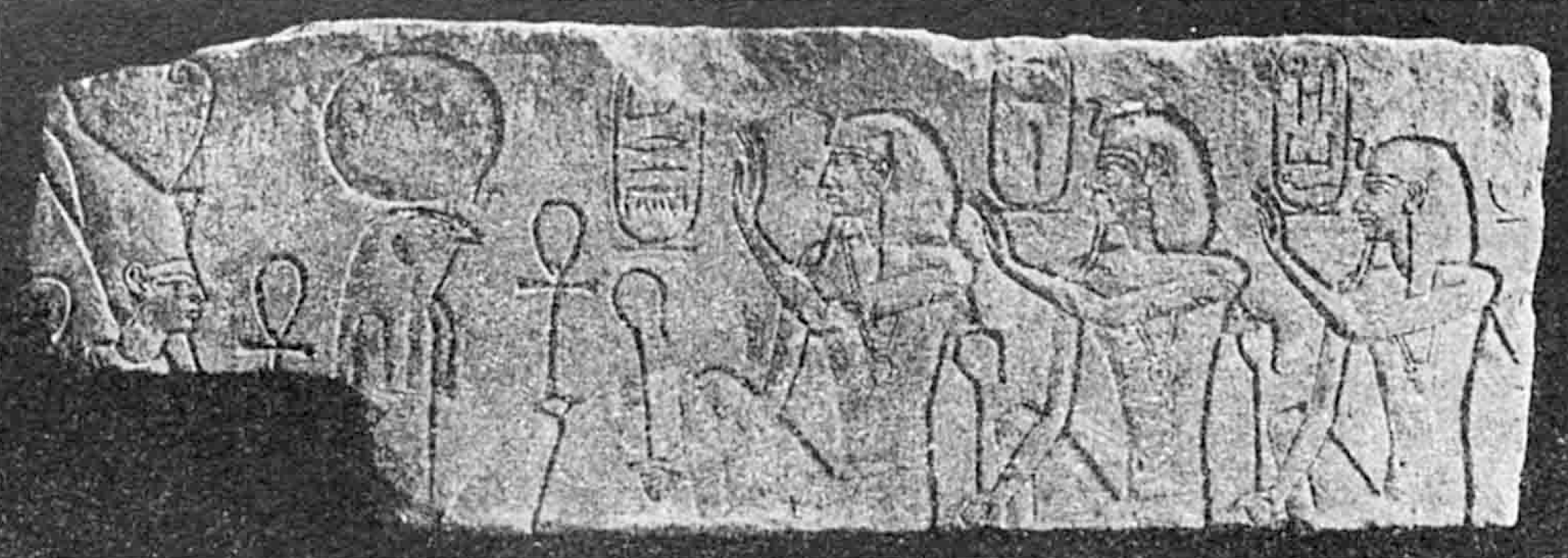
Relief from a Saqqara tomb dating to the Ramesside Period showing, from left to right, Djoser, Teti, and Userkaf (Note: It's believed by some Egyptoligists that Teti is the one being mentioned in the middle cartouche. However, it is possible that the pharaohs are listed in chronological order based on when they ruled, which in that case, the middle cartouche would be referring to Sekhemkhet, whose nomen was also Teti.)

In January 2021, the Egyptian Ministry of Tourism and Antiquities announced the discovery of more than 50 wooden sarcophagi in 52 burial shafts dating back to the New Kingdom period, as well as a 13 ft-long papyrus containing texts from the Book of the Dead.

Archaeologists led by Zahi Hawass at Saqqara also found the funerary temple of queen Neith and warehouses made of bricks. Previously unknown to researchers, she was a wife of Teti.

== See also ==
- List of Egyptian pyramids
- List of megalithic sites

== Bibliography ==
- Naguib Kanawati, Conspiracies in the Egyptian Palace: Unis to Pepy I, Routledge (2002), ISBN 0-415-27107-X.
- Osburn, William Jr. (1854). From the visit of Abram to the exodus. Trübner & Co.
