= Tetiankhkem =

Ancient Egyptian prince

- Born: c. 2350 BC
- Died: c. 2335 BC (aged c. 15)
- Burial: Badrashin, Giza, Egypt
- Father: Teti
- Mother: Khuit

Tetiankhkem (c. 2350 BC - c. 2335 BC) was an Ancient Egyptian prince who lived at the beginning of the Sixth Dynasty of Egypt.

His name means "Tetiankh the Black" or "Black Teti lives" and is connected to the word Kemet, which is an Egyptian term for Egypt.

He was a son of King Teti and his wife, Queen Khuit and thus a half-brother of Pepi I Meryre. He was named after his father.

This man was likely a crown prince for some time, just like his half-brother Nebkauhor, son of Iput.

Tetiankhkem died when he was around 15 years old and was buried in a mastaba located on the east side of Iput's funerary complex.

== Titles ==
- "Eldest king’s son"
