= Sesheshet =

- King's mother
- Burial: Saqqara, Egypt
- Issue: Teti
Egyptian name
z S z S tSš sš.t

Sesheshet, occasionally known as Sesh, was the mother of King Teti, the first and founding king of the Sixth Dynasty of Ancient Egypt. She was instrumental in enabling her son to gain the throne and reconciling two warring factions of the royal family.

In 2008, archeologists discovered what is believed to have been her pyramid.

== Family ==
Sesheshet was a grandmother of King Pepi I. Queen Iput I, Teti's wife, was a daughter of King Unas, the last king of the Fifth Dynasty. The dynasty that arose from Teti is considered part of the Old Kingdom of Egypt, a term designated by modern historians.

There was no break in the royal lines or the location of the capital from its predecessors, but significant cultural changes occurred to prompt the designation of different periods by scholars.

Until the recent rediscovery of her pyramid, little contemporary evidence about Sesheshet had been found. Her estates under the title King's Mother are mentioned in the tomb of the early Sixth Dynasty vizier Mehi, and she is referenced in passing as the mother of Teti in a remedy for baldness in the Ebers Papyrus.

Teti named his daughters after his mother.

== Pyramid discovery ==
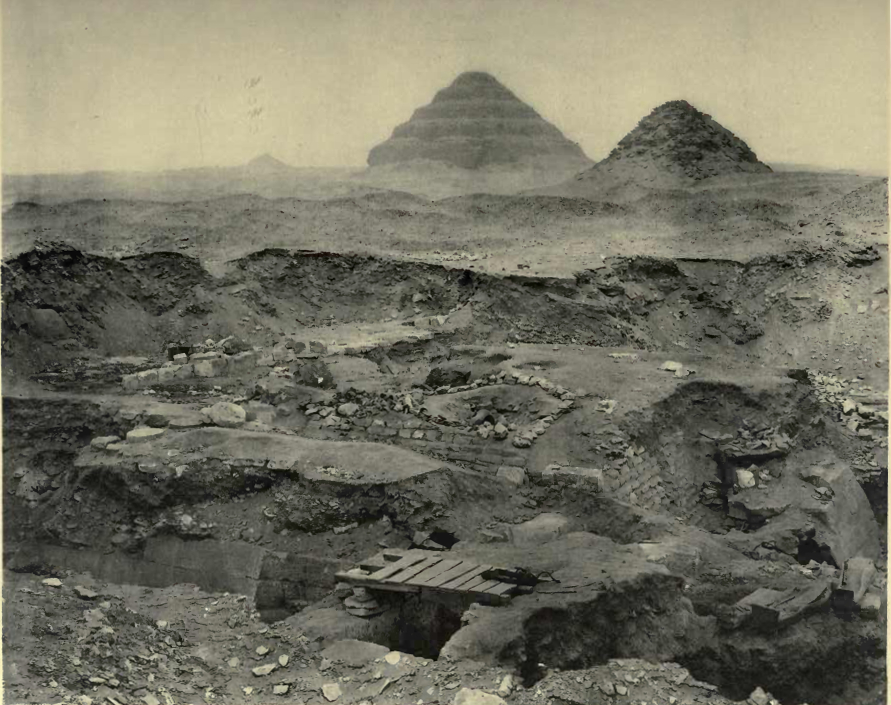
The satellite pyramid of the Teti Pyramid during the ongoing excavations in 1906

On 8 November 2008, Egypt's chief archaeologist, Zahi Hawass, then secretary general of the Supreme Council of Antiquities (2002–2011), announced that Sesheshet was entombed in a 4,300-year-old, topless pyramid at Saqqara that measures 5 metres (16 ft) tall. Hawass stated that this may be Saqqara's most complete subsidiary pyramid. The tomb is number 118 among the ancient pyramids discovered so far in Egypt. The largest part of its 2 metres (6.6 ft) wide casing was built with a superstructure 5 metres (16 ft) high.

Hawass's archaeological team began excavating the site in 2006. The discovery of the pyramid was made in September 2008 with the unearthing of the structure from the sand. The structure originally reached 14 metres (46 ft) in height, with sides 22 metres (72 ft) long.

Once five stories tall, the pyramid was discovered beneath 7 metres (23 ft) of sand, a small shrine, and mud-brick walls from later periods. It is the third known "subsidiary" pyramid to Teti's tomb and originally was 14 metres (46 ft) and 22 metres (72 ft) at its base, due to its walls having stood at a 51-degree angle. Buried next to the Saqqara Step pyramid, its base lies nineteen metres underground.

The pyramid of Sesheshet lies near two other pyramids which belong to Unas's wive and daughter, Khuit II (queen)[] and Iput I (daughter)[]. Archeologists entered the pyramid on 8 January 2009. The remains of what are thought to be Sesheshet were found in the sarcophagus of the tomb. The mummy was found wrapped in cloth in the 22-metre long and four-metre wide chamber. Even though the archaeologists did not find the name of the queen in hieroglyphs, there is evidence to suggest that the mummy was the mother of the Sixth Dynasty ruler Teti, Hawass said in the statement. "It is believed that these remains belong to Queen Sesheshet, especially because the pyramid was not built for worship but it was a burial pyramid," he said. Hawass also stated that the sarcophagus appeared to have been looted. Ancient robbers had stolen most of the valuables from inside the sarcophagus, leaving behind the body parts, some pottery and gold that was used to cover fingers of royal pharaohs.

Although ancient graphics in good condition adorn the structure, it is presumed that the tomb was robbed of its valuable artifacts centuries ago.
