= Sessions (surname) =

Sessions is a surname of Anglo-Norman origin, ultimately from the French Soissons. Notable people with the surname include:

- Almira Sessions (1888–1974), American actress
- Clarence W. Sessions (1859–1931), American judge
- Heath Sessions, American politician
- Jeff Sessions (born 1946), United States Attorney General and United States Senator
- John Sessions (born 1953–2020), British actor and comedian
- J. Wyley Sessions (1885–1977), American religious official
- Kate Sessions (1857–1940), American horticulturist
- Loren B. Sessions (1827–1897), New York politician
- Mabel Sessions (1895–1990), American newspaper editor, publisher, and socialite
- Michael Sessions (born 1987), American politician and Michigan mayor
- Patty Bartlett Sessions (1795–1892), American mother, pioneer, agriculturalist and midwife
- Pete Sessions (born 1955), American politician and Texas Congressman
- Ramon Sessions (born 1986), American professional basketball player for the Washington Wizards
- Roger Sessions (1896–1985), American composer
- Tiffany Sessions (born 1968), American woman who has been missing since 1989
- Walter L. Sessions (1820–1896), United States Congressman from New York
- William K. Sessions III (born 1947), American judge in Vermont
- William S. Sessions (1930–2020), American judge and FBI Director
