= Session =

Session may refer to:

== Bureaucracy and law ==
- Session (parliamentary procedure)
- Session (Presbyterian), a governing body in Presbyterian polity
- Court of Session, the supreme civil court of Scotland
- Executive session, a portion of the United States Senate's daily session
- Legislative session

== Computing ==
- Session (computer science), a semi-permanent interactive information exchange between communicating devices
- Session (web analytics), in web analytics, measuring a continuous period of browsing of a website by a particular user
- Session, a group of process groups in POSIX-conformant operating systems
- Login session
- Session (software), a cross-platform end-to-end encrypted instant messaging application.

== Music ==
=== Contexts ===
- Jam session, where musicians gather and play
- Pub session, playing music in a public house
- Recording session, where musicians record music together

=== Works ===
- Session (Ned's Atomic Dustbin album), a 2004 album by Ned's Atomic Dustbin
- "Session", an instrumental song by Linkin Park from their 2003 album Meteora
- "Session", a song by The Offspring from their 1992 album Ignition
- "Session", a song by Tyler, the Creator from the album Bastard

=== Other uses in music ===
- Optical disc sessions, the layout of data on a compact disc or DVD
- Session musician, musicians available for hire

== Other uses ==
- Academic term, sometimes called a "session"
- Session of Christ, the Christian doctrine of Jesus' place in heaven
- Session: Skate Sim, a skateboarding video game released in 2022
- Session, a 2018 short film directed by Buğra Mert Alkayalar

== See also ==
- Cession
- Court of Session (disambiguation)
- Sessions (disambiguation)
