= Khuit II =

x w i t

Queen consort of Egypt
- Tenure: c. 2360 BC
- King: Teti
- Burial: Badrshein, Giza, Egypt
- Spouse: Teti
- Issue: Tetiankhkem

Khuit II (fl. c. 2360 BC) was a wife of King Teti, the first king of the Sixth Dynasty of Egypt.

== Biography ==
Khuit may have been the first prominent royal wife from the reign of Teti. If so, her position would later be taken over by Iput. Khuit may have been the mother of King Userkare (according to Jánosi and Callender), but this is not at all certain and some would have a queen named Khentkaus IV as the mother of Userkare. Khuit was the mother of Tetiankhkem, whilst Khuit's daughter could have been Seshseshet Sheshit.

According to her monuments, Khuit held the titles:

- King's Wife (ḥmt-niswt) and King's Wife, his beloved (ḥmt-niswt mryt.f)
- Companion of Horus (smrt-ḥrw)

== Burial ==
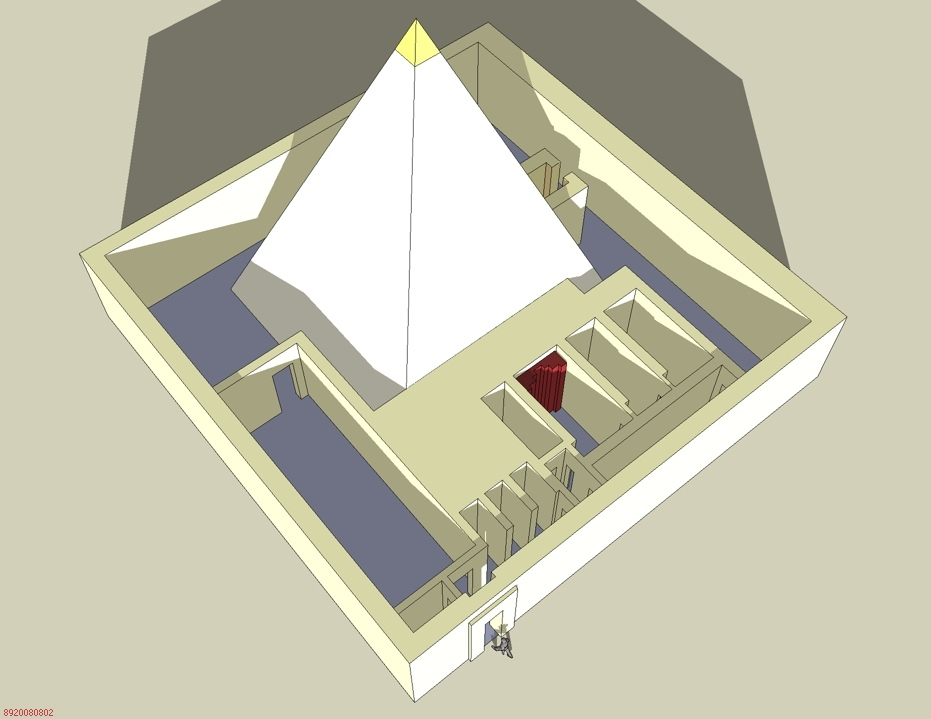
Pyramid complex of Khuit in Saqqara

The pyramids of Iput I and Khuit were discovered between July 1897 and February 1899 by Victor Loret just north of Teti's pyramid complex at Saqqara.

Loret initially thought Khuit's tomb was a mastaba. Excavations in the 1960s by Maragioglio and Rinaldi first suggested that Khuit had been buried in a pyramid. Remains of masonry belonging to the ruins of a small mortuary temple were found as well. Further excavations in 1995 by Hawass have confirmed that Khuit's tomb was a pyramid. Excavations of the pyramid itself revealed a burial chamber with a pink granite sarcophagus. The mortuary temple associated with her funerary complex is located to the east of the pyramid. The temple included an offering room with a false door and an altar. The temple walls were decorated and showed scenes of offering bearers.
