= Iput I =

Ancient Egyptian queen consort

i p w t

Queen consort of Egypt
- Tenure: c. 2360 BC
- King: Teti
- Born: c. 2375 BC
- Died: c. 2325 BC (aged c. 50)
- Burial: Badrashin, Giza, Egypt
- Spouse: Teti
- Issue: Pepi I; Nebkauhor; Seshseshet; Seshseshet; Seshseshet; Seshseshet

Iput I (c. 2375 BC – c. 2325 BC) was a queen of ancient Egypt and a daughter of King Unas, the last king of the Fifth Dynasty of Egypt. She married Teti, the first King of the Sixth Dynasty of Egypt. Their son was Pepi I. She possibly ruled as regent for her son Pepi I.

== Life ==
Iput may have been a daughter of the Fifth Dynasty King Unas. Her mother was Nebet or Khenut. She married King Teti, who was the first king of the Sixth Dynasty of Egypt. Their son was King Pepi I. Iput is depicted with her son Pepi on a decree-stela from Koptos. The skeletal remains found at her pyramid show she died as a middle-aged woman.

Iput had another son, Nebkauhor. She had several daughters: Seshseshet Waatetkhethor, Seshseshet Idut, Seshseshet Nubkhetnebty and Seshseshet Sathor.

=== Titles of Iput I ===
Iput I held several titles because she was the daughter of a king: Daughter of the King of Upper and Lower Egypt (s3t-niswt-biti), King's Daughter of his body (s3t-niswt-nt-kht.f), God's Daughter (s3t-ntr), This God's Daughter (s3t-ntr-wt).

Other titles are because she was married to a pharaoh: King's Wife, his beloved (hmt-nisw meryt.f), Companion of Horus (smrt-hrw), Great one of the hetes-sceptre (wrt-hetes), She who sees Horus and Seth (m33t-hrw-stsh), and Great of Praises (wrt-hzwt).

Iput gained even more titles when her son Pepi I took the throne: King's Mother (mwt-niswt), Mother of the Dual King (mwt-niswt-biti) and King's Mother of the pyramid Mennefer-Pepy (mwt-niswt-mn-nfr-ppy).

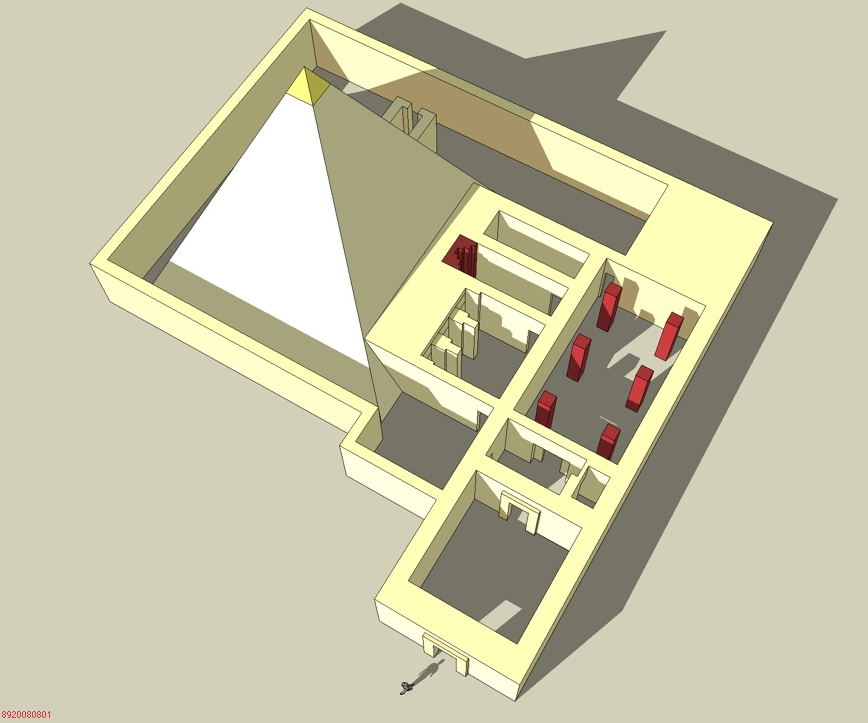
Pyramid of Iput I

== Burial ==
Iput was buried in Saqqara, in a pyramid near that of Teti. The pyramids of Iput and Khuit were discovered between July 1897 and February 1899 by Victor Loret. Iput's tomb was originally a mastaba, but was transformed into a pyramid on the accession of her son Pepi to the throne.

The burial chamber contained a limestone sarcophagus, and a cedar coffin. Remains of a middle-aged woman were found. Some of her funerary equipment has survived. These include canopic vessels, a headrest, and a gold bracelet. Her remains are in the Egyptian Museum in Cairo. The gold bracelet was found on Iput's arm. The chamber further contained several vessels including polished red pottery and a rock crystal cup. Model vessels and tools were included in the burial as well. Some of these had originally been covered in gold.
