= Mehus (disambiguation) =

Mehus is a surname.

Mehus may also refer to:

- Mehus, Nordland, a village in Nordland, Norway
- Mehus, a village in Sheikhpura district, Bihar, India
- Belle Mehus Auditorium, music venue in Bismarck, North Dakota, United States

== See also ==
- Mehu (c. 2300 BC), Sixth Dynasty Egyptian vizier
- Melhus (disambiguation)
