= Senedjemib Inti =

- Vizier of Egypt
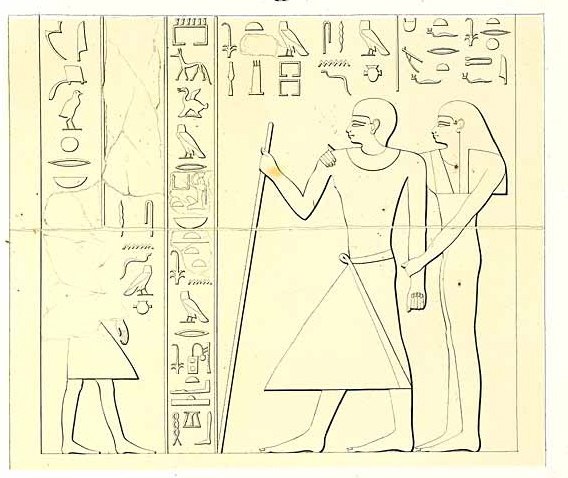
- Senedjemib and his wife Tjefi
- Tenure: c. 2375 BC
- Pharaoh: Isesi
- Burial: Giza, Giza Governorate, Egypt
- Spouse: Tjefi
- Children: Senedjemib; Niankhmin

Senedjemib Inti (died c. 2375 BC) was a vizier from the Fifth Dynasty of Egypt during the reign of king Djedkare Isesi.

== Family ==
Senedjemib Inti married a woman named Tjefi. Senedjemib Inti and Tjefi had several children:

- Senedjemib Mehi was the eldest son of Inti and Tjefi. Mehi served as vizier, likely under Unas.
- Fetekti (?) – The middle of three sons depicted with their parents in a marsh scene was likely called Fetekti. This person may be identical to Kakherptah Feteki (G 5560) who was a judge and administrator, overseer of the Memphite and Letopolite nomes, inspector of wab-priests of the pyramid of Khufu, overseer of new settlements of the pyramid of Isesi, overseer of scribes, great one of the tens of Upper Egypt, pre-eminent of place, director of scribes connected with the moon, and priest of Maat.
- Khnumenti, likely second son of Inti and Tjefi. Served under Unas and later in his career Khnumenti served as vizier.
- Niankhmin is depicted in Inti's tomb and served as a lector priest in his father's funerary establishment.

== Burial ==
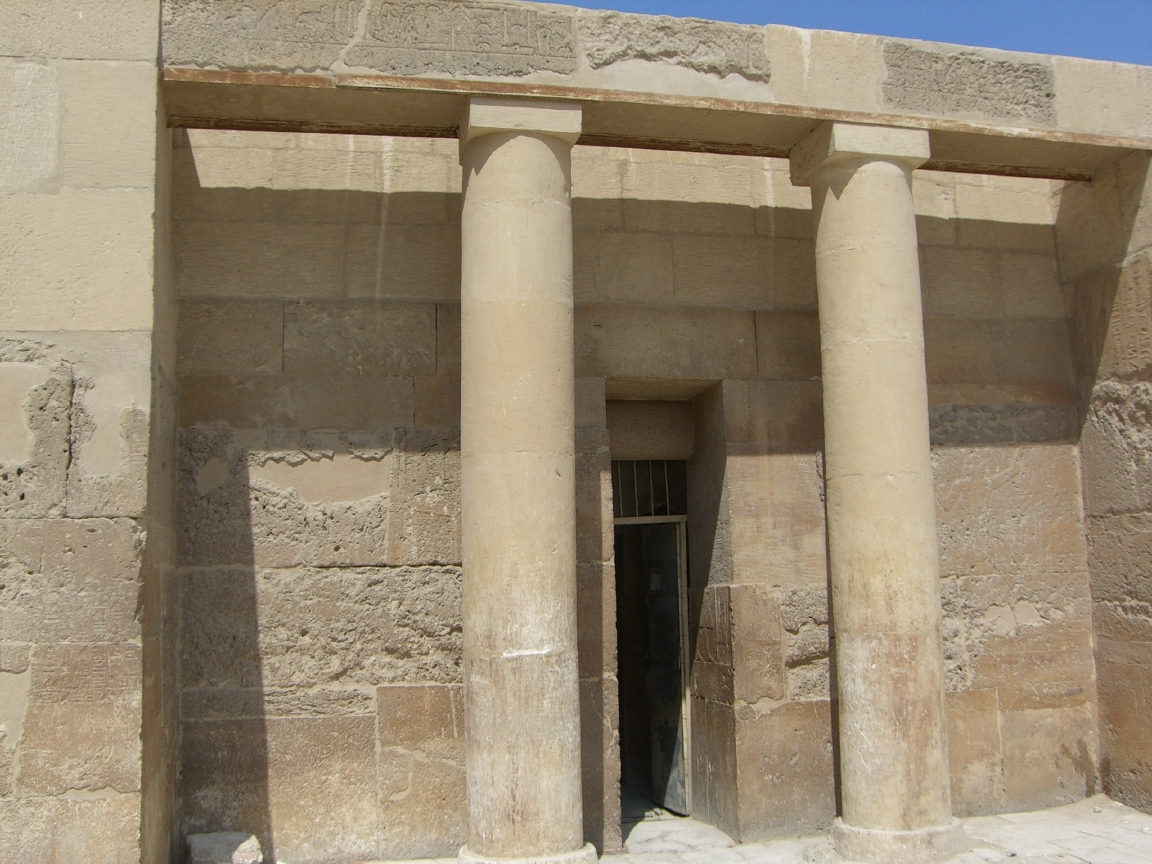
Mastaba of Senedjemib Inti

Senedjemib Inti was buried in mastaba G 2370 in Giza.

Decrees from Djedkare Isesi to Senedjemib Inti were found inscribed on the walls of his tomb. In the decrees, Isesi praises the actions of his official, which was a source of pride for Senedjemib Inti's family. Unsurprisingly thus, Senedjemib Inti or his son Senedjemib Mehi commissioned their inscriptions on the walls of the tomb.

One royal decree is addressed to the chief justice overseer of all works of the king and overseer of scribes of royal documents, Senedjemib. This decree mentions the planning of a court or a pool within the precincts of the jubilee palace built for Isesi's sed festival. The palace may have borne the name "Lotus-of-Isesi". although this is debated. This decree is likely dated to the year of the 16th cattle count, 4th month of the 3rd season, day 28. A second letter to Senedjemib Inti concerns a draft of the inscriptions of a structure called the "Sacred Marriage Chapel of Isesi" which could be a chapel to Hathor.

Senedjemib Inti died during the reign of Djedkare Isesi. Inscriptions in the tomb of Inti describe how his son, Senedjemib Mehi, asks and receives permission to bring a sarcophagus from Tura. Senedjemib Mehi would later follow in his father's footsteps and become vizier.
