= Desert hare (disambiguation) =

Desert hare may refer to:

- Desert hare (Lepus tibetanus), found in Northwest China
- Cape hare (Lepus capensis), found in Africa and west/central Asia
  - Hare (hieroglyph), depicting the Cape hare
- Black-tailed jackrabbit (Lepus californicus), also called the American desert hare; found in the US and Mexico
