= Senedjemib Mehi =

- Vizier of Egypt
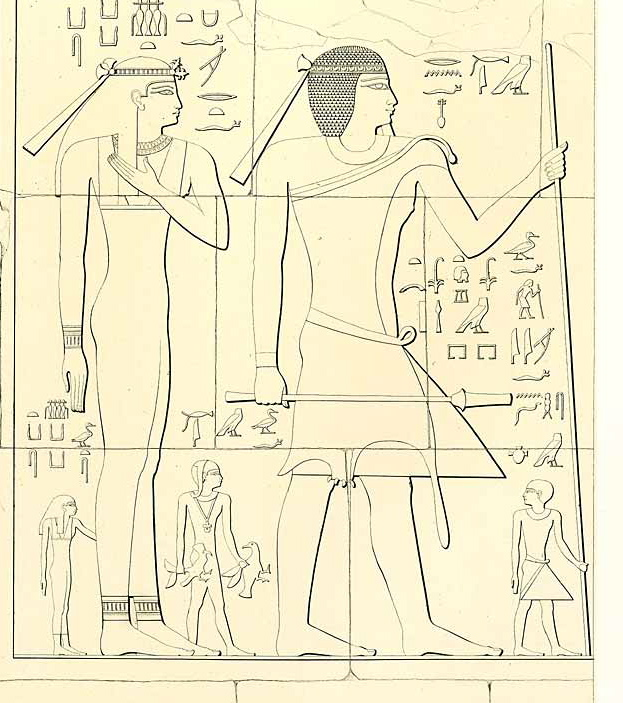
- Mehi and his wife Khentkaus. With them are their children.
- Tenure: c. 2375 BC
- Pharaoh: Isesi; Unas
- Father: Senedjemib Inti
- Mother: Tjefi
- Wife: Khentkaus
- Children: Senedjemib; Mehi; Khentkaus
- Burial: Giza, Giza Governorate, Egypt

Senedjemib Mehi (fl. c. 2375 BC) was a vizier from the Fifth Dynasty of Egypt. He started out his career under Djedkare Isesi and eventually became vizier under Unas.

== Titles ==
Senedjemib Mehi held many titles, all recorded in his tomb, showing that he made a successful career:

- "Pillar of the knmt-folk"
- "Favorite of the king" and "favorite of the king wherever he is"
- "Overseer of the two workshops"
- "Overseer of the two armories"
- "Overseer of the two houses of gold"
- "Overseer of (all) royal regalia"
- "Overseer of scribes of royal records"
- "Overseer of royal linen"
- "Overseer of the two granaries"
- "Overseer of all works of the king"
- "Hereditary prince"
- "Royal master builder in both houses" (i.e. in Upper and Lower Egypt)
- "True count"
- "Master of secrets of all commands of the king"
- "Royal chamberlain"
- "Sole friend" (i.e. of the king)
- "Chief justice and vizier”

== Family ==
Senedjemib Mehi was the son of Senedjemib Inti and Tjefi. Mehi was married to Khentkaus, who was a King's daughter. She could be a daughter of Unas or possibly of Djedkare Isesi. They had at least three children:

- Senedjemib: Named after his grandfather
- Mehi: Named after his father
- Khentkaus: Named after her mother

== Burial ==
Senedjemib Mehi was buried in tomb G2378 in Giza West Field immediately next to the tomb of his father.

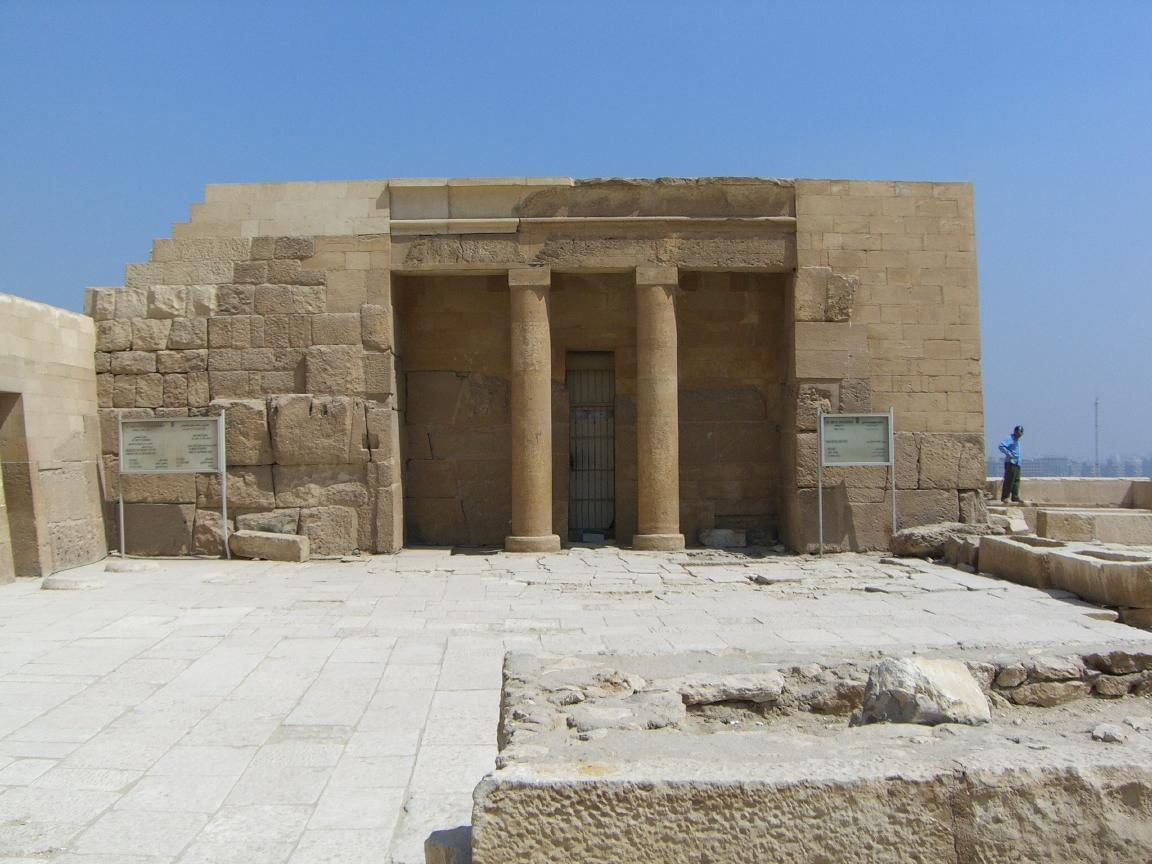
Mastaba of Senedjemib Inti (father), the tomb of Senedjemib Mehi (son) is immediately to the left.

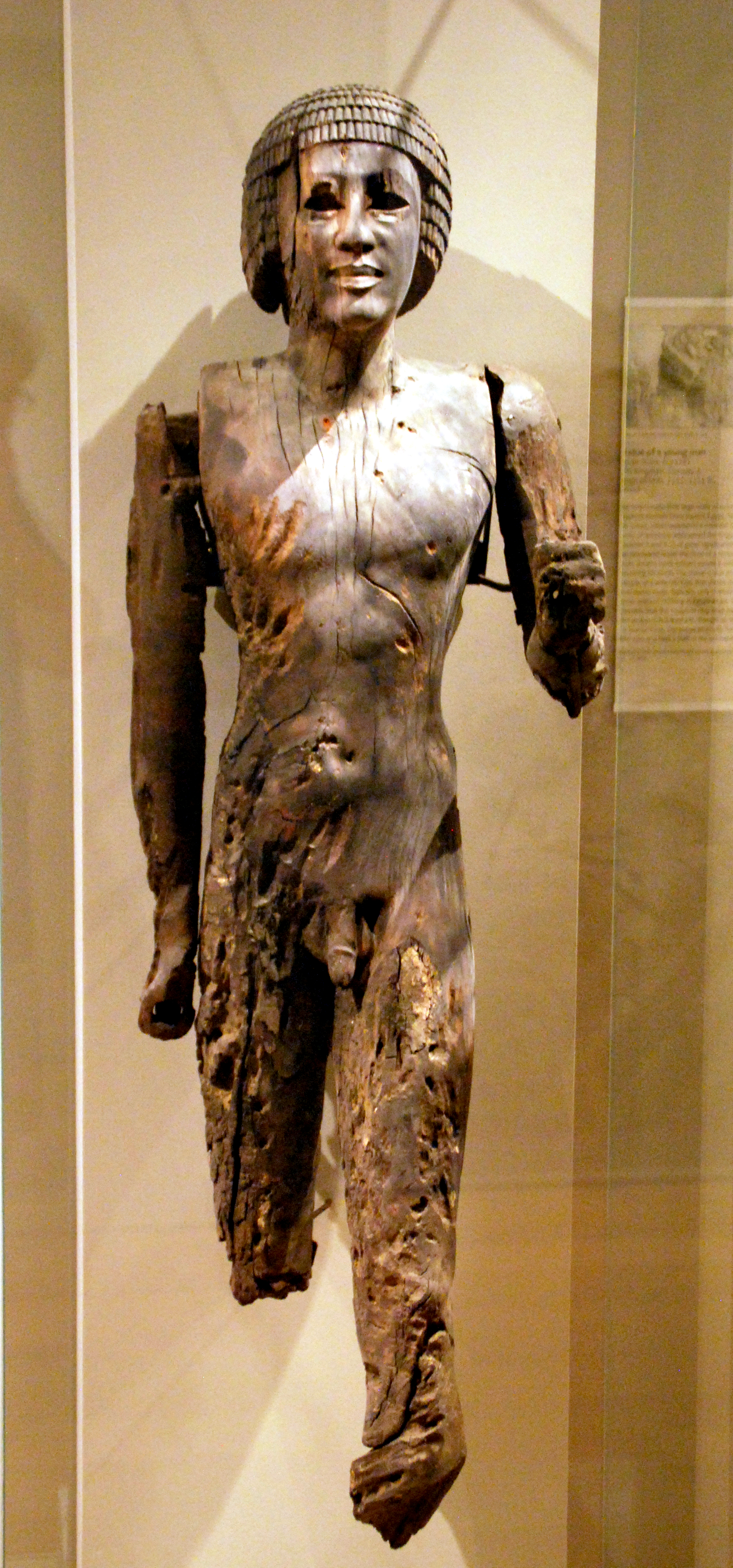
wooden statue of Senedjemib Mehi, Museum of Fine Arts, Boston
