= Mehus =

Family name

Mehus (pronounced May-hewz or May-hoose, and meaning middle house in Norwegian) is a last name common to Flemish and Norwegian people. In the United States it is most common in North Dakota.

== People with the surname ==
- Alma Mehus (1902-2001), American pianist and arts community leader
- Belle Mehus (1896-1988), American pianist, namesake of the Belle Mehus Auditorium in Bismarck, North Dakota
- Ingrid Berg Mehus, subject of Alexander Ryback's 2009 song "Fairytale"
- John H. Mehus, American navy commander of the USS Clearwater County
- Laurelle Mehus, American model and actress, appeared in the 1990 film Pretty Woman
- Livio Mehus (1630-1691), Flemish painter
- Oscar Myking Mehus (1894-1983), American educator

== See also ==
- Mehu, an Ancient Egypt vizier who lived in the Sixth Dynasty, around 2300 BC
