= Melhus =

Melhus may refer to:

== Places ==
- Melhus Municipality, a municipality in Trøndelag county, Norway
- Melhus (village), a village within Melhus Municipality in Trøndelag county, Norway
- Melhus Church, a church in Melhus Municipality in Trøndelag county, Norway
- Melhus Station, a railway station in Melhus Municipality in Trøndelag county, Norway

== Other ==
- Melhus Energi, a defunct power company in Melhus Municipality in Trøndelag county, Norway
- Melhus IL, a Norwegian sports club from Melhus Municipality in Trøndelag county, Norway
- Melhus Sparebank, a Norwegian savings bank

== People with the surname ==
- Bjørn Melhus, a German artist of Norwegian ancestry
- Gunhild Melhus, a Norwegian physician and environmental advocate

== See also ==
- Mehus (disambiguation)
