= Unut =

Ancient Egyptian deity

- The egyptian goddess Unut based on other hare-headed deities
Name in hieroglyphs
wn n nw t I12
- Major cult center: Hermopolis
- Symbol: Hare
- Consort: Wenenu

Unut, also known as Wenut or Wenet, was a prehistoric Ancient Egyptian hare and snake goddess of fertility and new birth.

Known as "The swift one", the animal sacred to her was the hare, but originally, she had the form of a snake. She came from the fifteenth Upper Egyptian province, the Hare nome (called Wenet in Egyptian), and was worshipped with Thoth at its capital Hermopolis (in Egyptian: Wenu). Later she was depicted with a woman's body and a hare's head. She was taken into the cult of Horus and later of Ra.

== Etymology ==
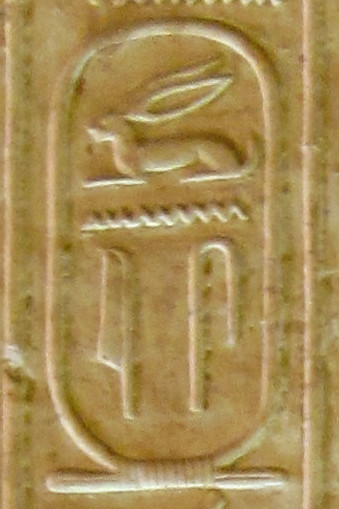
Cartouche of pharaoh Unas with the hare of the goddess Unut

Her name can be represented with five different hieroglyphs, but she rarely appears in literature and inscriptions. Her name was taken into the highest royal position just once in the long Egyptian history. Her male companion is Wenenu, who was sometimes regarded as a form of Osiris or Ra.

The only king bearing her name was Unas.

== Iconography ==
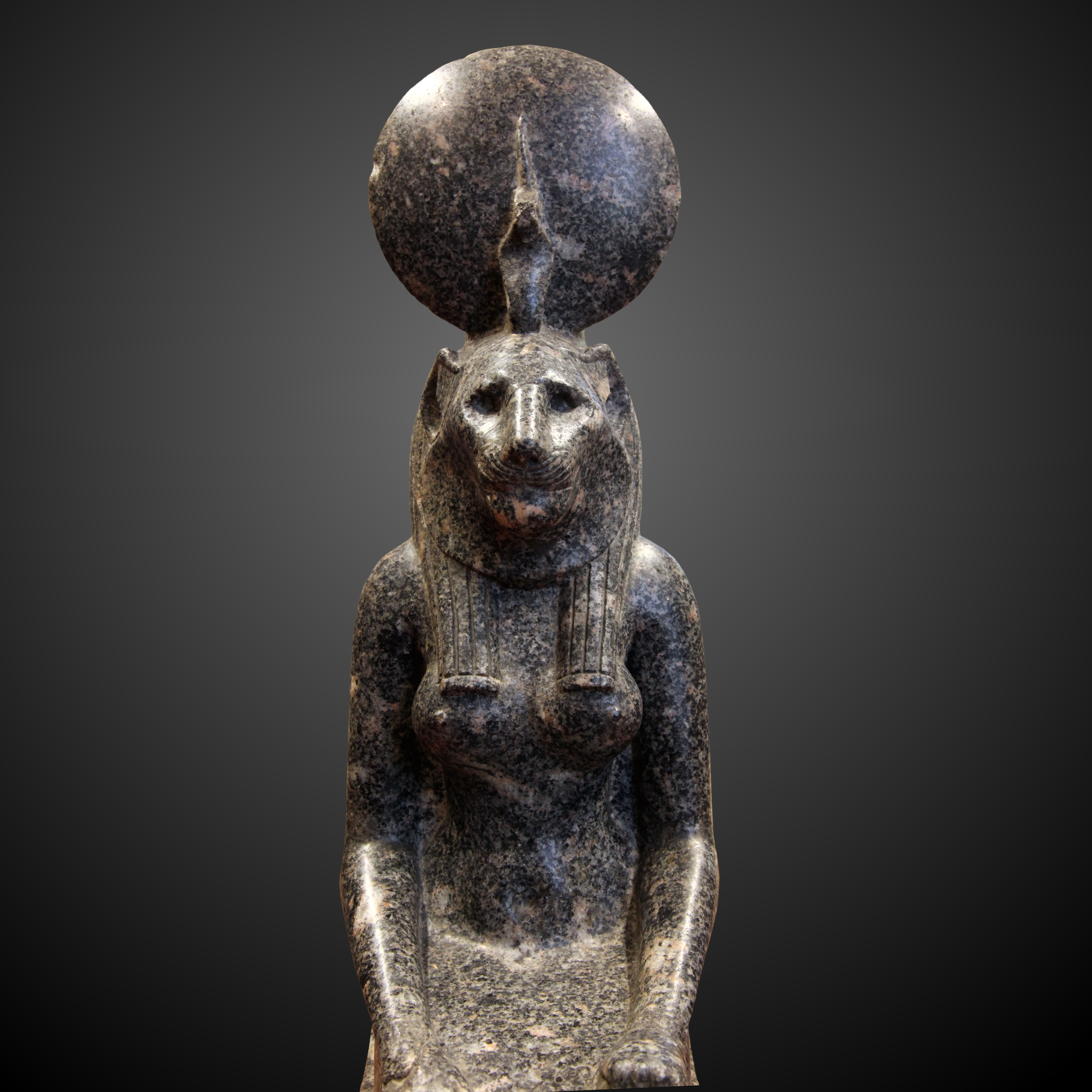
Unut depicted with the head of a lioness, Louvre Museum

Unut is commonly portrayed as a woman with the head of the desert or Cape hare, Lepus capensis of Egypt. The Egyptians regarded the hare as an example of swiftness, alertness, and keen senses, but the animal’s form was also taken by certain underworld deities. Amulets made in the shape of the hare may have related to some aspect of the creature’s nature or may have been symbolic of this goddess.
