= Hare (hieroglyph) =

Egyptian hieroglyph

E34
Hare
in hieroglyphs

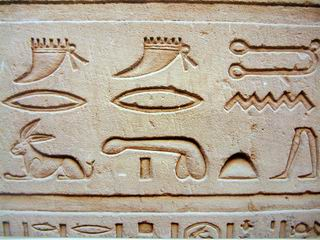
Hare hieroglyph in text (reading left-to-right)

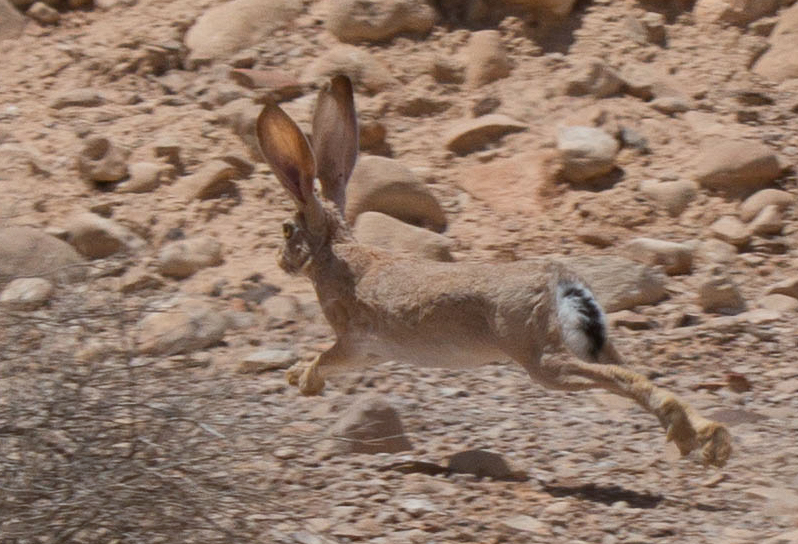
Lepus capensis sinaiticus

The ancient Egyptian Hare hieroglyph, Gardiner sign listed no. E34 (𓃹) is a portrayal of the desert hare or Cape hare, Lepus capensis of Egypt, within the Gardiner signs for mammals. The ancients used the name of sekhat for the hare.

It is an Egyptian language biliteral with the value wn, (or un), often used in a hieroglyph composition block with the horizontal n. E34 N35 N35 or E34 N35

The biliteral expresses the sound "oon", or "oonen",; it is also an ideogram for the verb "to be", or "to exist", (i.e. "is", "are", "was", etc.).

The famous Pharaoh Unas, (for his Pyramid Texts), is named using the hare hieroglyph. It also appears in the name of Wenamun, a (possibly fictional) priest who appears in a famous history of c. 1000 BCE.

}

Preceded by N8 sun-with-rays - "uben"-phon.-etc. (complex, many word uses)	E34 hare -- un	Succeeded by R14 unem (right = "west"); Emblem of the West (hieroglyph)
Succeeded by G36,F25 swallow-(bil.)--animal leg-(tril.) ---- ur ---- ---- uhm ----

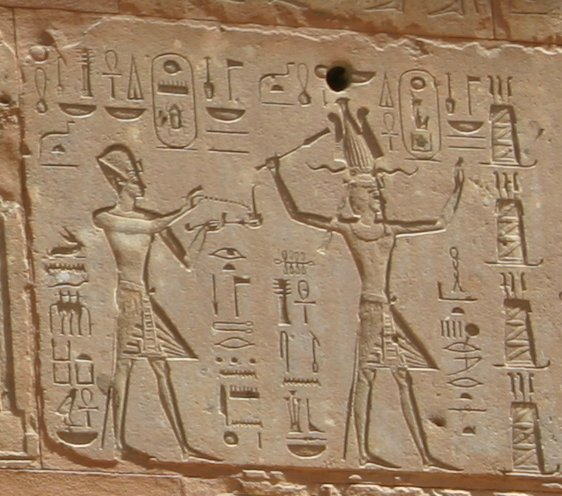
Relief

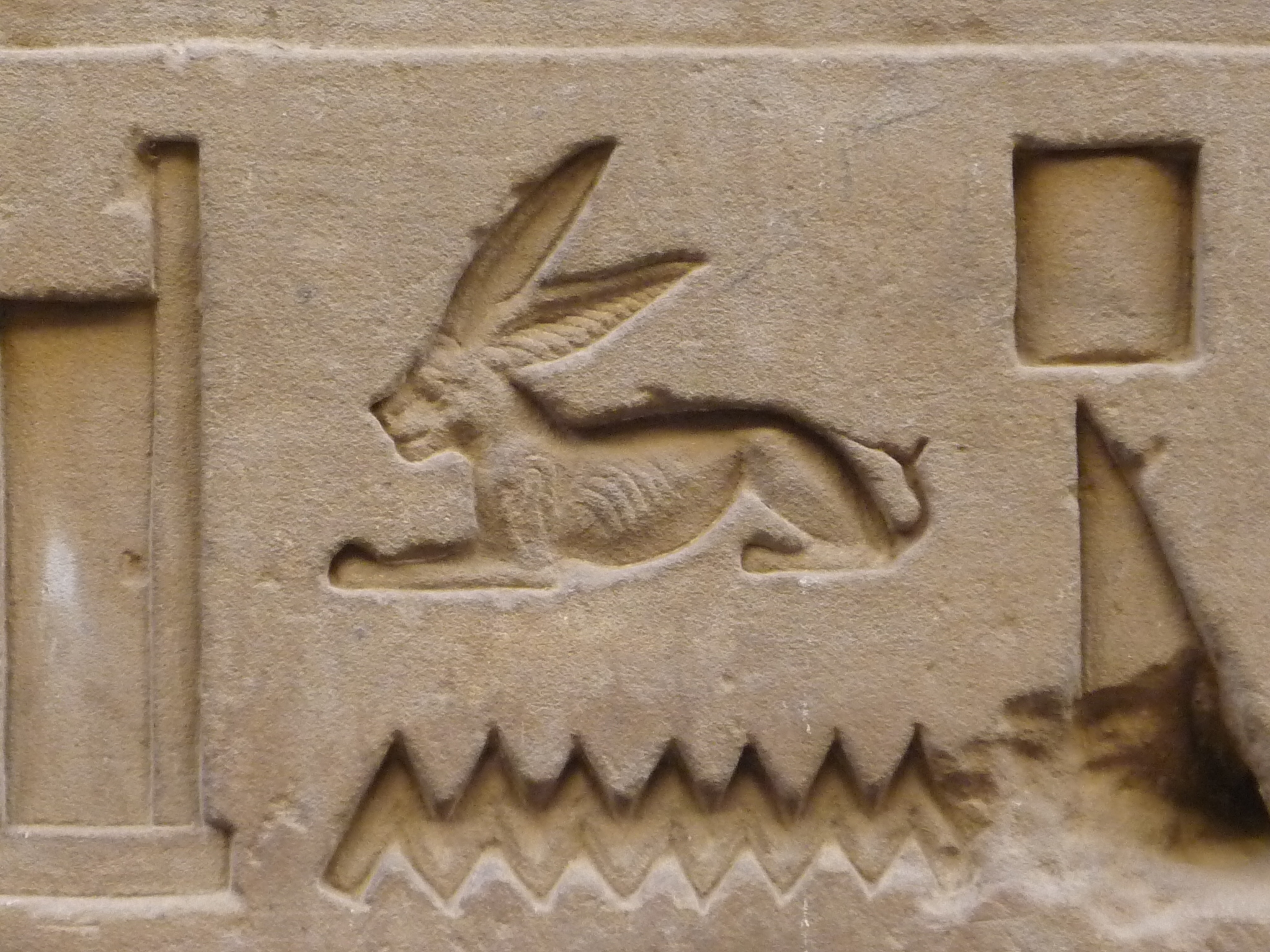
Detail of Hare and water-ripple quadrat (hieroglyph block)
(also shows Stool-or-mat (hieroglyph) and Throne (hieroglyph))

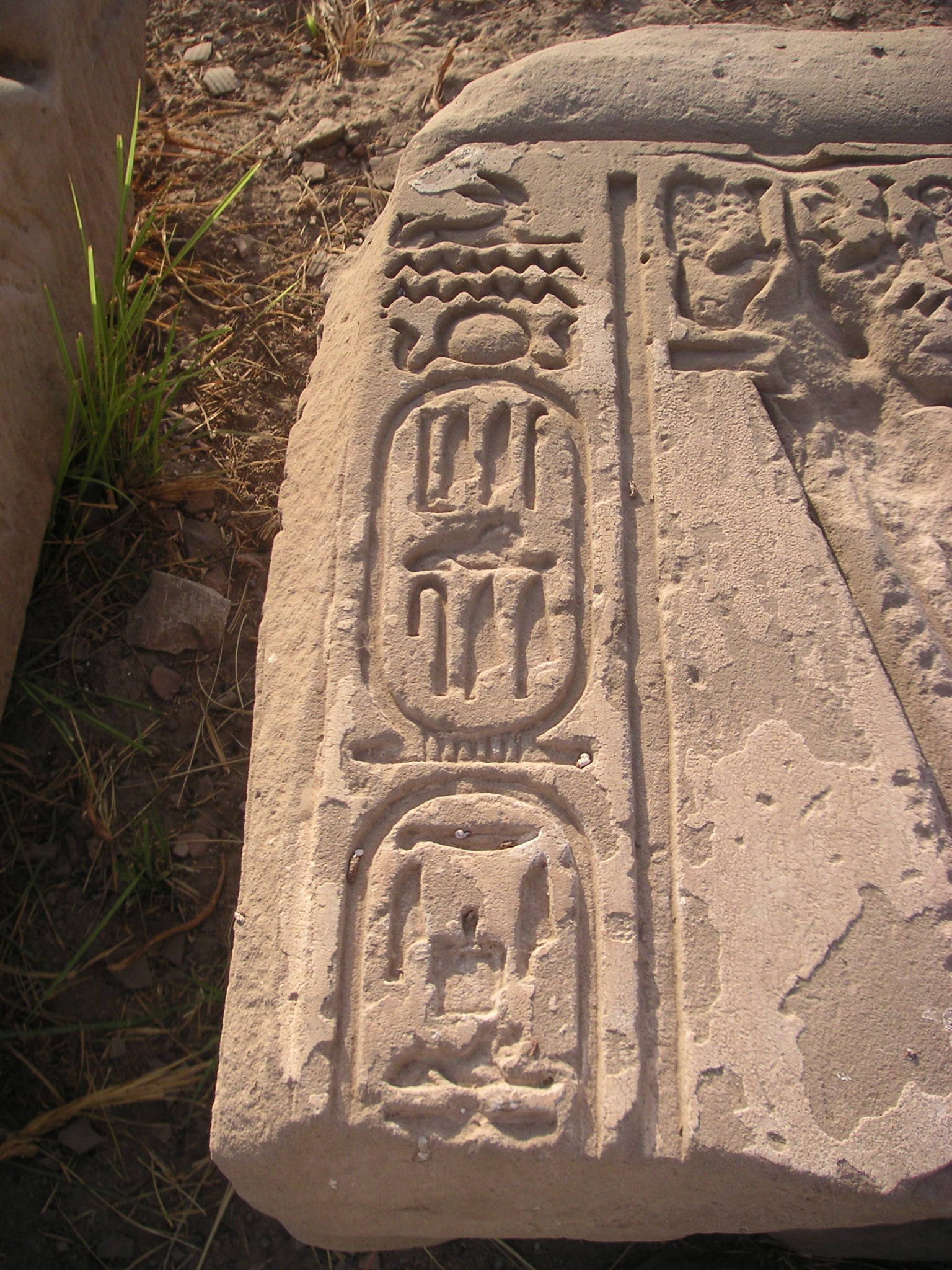
Vertical text, hare hieroglyph at beginning

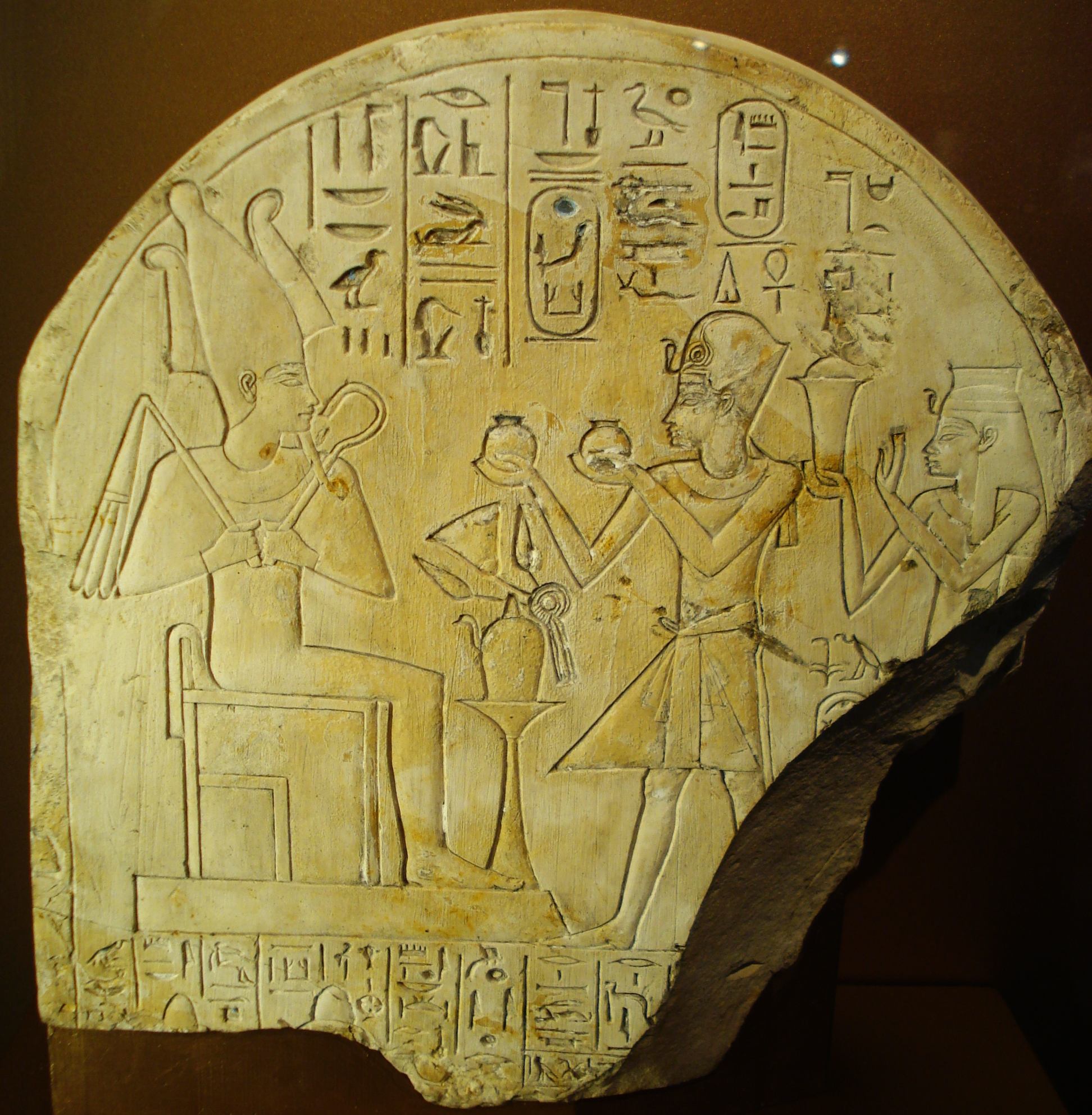
Partially missing lunette of a stela; Finely executed in shallow, incised-bas relief

== See also ==
- Gardiner's Sign List#E. Mammals
- List of Egyptian hieroglyphs
- Pharaoh Unas - (titulary)
