= Unas =

Egyptian pharaoh

- Oenas, Onnos, Unis, Wenis
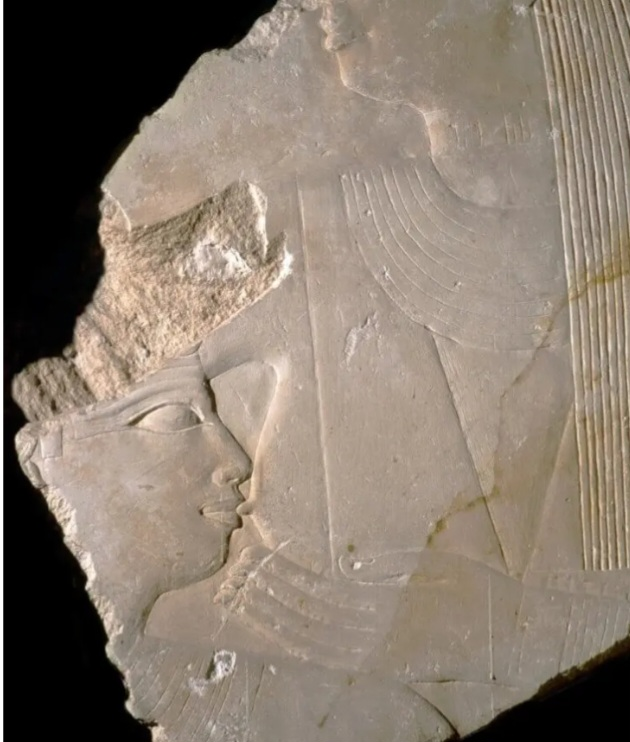
- Unas being suckled by the goddess Iat, Egyptian Museum

Pharaoh
- Reign: Around 30 years, c. 2375 - c. 2345 BC (Note: Proposed dates for Unas's reign: 2404–2374 BC, 2375–2345 BC, 2367–2347 BC, 2353–2323 BC, 2342–2322 BC, 2321–2306 BC 2312–2282 BC.)
- Predecessor: Djedkare Isesi
- Successor: Teti
Royal titulary
Horus name
Wadjtawy
W3ḏ-t3.w(j)
Horus, Flourishing of the Two Lands
Alternative translation:
The sturdy one of the Two Lands
G5	M13 N19
Nebty name
Wadjemnebty
W3ḏ-m-nb.tj
He who flourishes through the Two Ladies
G16	M13 G17
Golden Horus
Bik-nebw-Wadj
Bjk-nb.w-w3ḏ
The golden falcon who flourishes
M13 G5 S12
Prenomen
Unas
Wnjs
Translation uncertain:
Behold the being (if Unas is read As-un)
The swift one (name of the goddess Wenet)
The one who truly exists
M23 t L2 t < G39 N5 E34 N35 M17 S29 >
Nomen
Unas
wnjs
Translation uncertain:
Behold the being (if Unas is read As-un)
The swift one (name of the goddess Wenet)
The one who truly exists
< G39 N5 E34 N35 M17 S29 >
Hieroglyphic variant:
< E34 N35 M17 S29 >
- Consorts: Nebet; Khenut
- Children: Hemetre Hemi, Khentkaues, Neferut, Nefertkaues Iku, and Sesheshet Idut
- Father: Possibly Djedkare Isesi
- Mother: Possibly Setibhor
- Died: c. 2345 BC
- Burial: Pyramid of Unas
- Dynasty: Fifth Dynasty

Unas /ˈjuːnəs/ or Wenis, also spelled Unis (Ancient Egyptian: wnjs, hellenized form Oenas /ˈiːnəs/ or Onnos; died c. 2345 BC), was a king, the ninth and last ruler of the Fifth Dynasty of Egypt during the Old Kingdom. Unas reigned for around 30 years in the mid-24th century BC (c. 2375–c. 2345 BC), succeeding Djedkare Isesi, who might have been his father.

Little is known of Unas's activities during his reign, which was a time of economic decline. Egypt maintained trade relations with the Levantine coast and Nubia, and military action may have taken place in southern Canaan. The growth and decentralization of the administration in conjunction with the lessening of the king's power continued under Unas, ultimately contributing to the collapse of the Old Kingdom some 200 years later.

Unas built a pyramid in Saqqara, the smallest of the royal pyramids completed during the Old Kingdom. The accompanying mortuary complex with its high and valley temples linked by a 750-metre-long (2,460 ft) causeway was lavishly decorated with painted reliefs, whose quality and variety surpass the usual royal iconography. Furthermore, Unas was the first pharaoh to have the Pyramid Texts carved and painted on the walls of the chambers of his pyramid, a major innovation that was followed by his successors until the First Intermediate Period (c. 2160 – c. 2050 BC). These texts identify the king with Ra and with Osiris, whose cult was on the rise in Unas's time, and were meant to help the king reach the afterlife.

Unas had several daughters and possibly one or two sons who are believed to have predeceased him. Manetho, a third-century BC Egyptian priest of the Ptolemaic Kingdom and author of the first history of Egypt, claims that with Unas's death the Fifth Dynasty came to an end. Unas was succeeded by Teti, the first king of the Sixth Dynasty, possibly after a short crisis. However, the archaeological evidence suggests that the Egyptians at the time made no conscious break with the preceding dynasty and the distinction between the Fifth and Sixth dynasties might be illusory.

The funerary cult of Unas established at his death continued until the end of the Old Kingdom and may have survived during the chaotic First Intermediate Period. The cult was still in existence or revived during the later Middle Kingdom (c. 2050 – c. 1650 BC). This did not prevent Amenemhat I and Senusret I (c. 1990 – c. 1930 BC) from partially dismantling the mortuary complex of Unas for its materials.

In parallel to the official cult, Unas may have received popular veneration as a local god of Saqqara until as late as the Late Period (664–332 BC), nearly 2,000 years after his death.

== Attestations ==
=== Historical sources ===
Unas is well attested by historical sources with three ancient Egyptian king lists dating to the New Kingdom period mentioning him. He occupies the 33rd entry of the Abydos King List, which was written during the reign of Seti I (1290–1279 BC). Unas's name is also present on the Saqqara Tablet (32nd entry) and on the Turin canon (third column, 25th row), both of which were written during the reign of Ramses II (1279–1213 BC). The Turin canon further credits Unas with 30 years of reign. These sources all place Unas as the ninth and final ruler of the Fifth Dynasty, succeeding Djedkare Isesi and preceding Teti on the throne. This relative chronology is corroborated by archaeological evidence, for example in the tomb of officials serving under these kings.

In addition to these sources, Unas was also likely mentioned in the Aegyptiaca, a history of Egypt written in the 3rd century BC during the reign of Ptolemy II (283–246 BC) by the Egyptian priest Manetho. No copies of the Aegyptiaca have survived to this day and it is known to us only through later writings by Sextus Julius Africanus and Eusebius. Africanus relates that the Aegyptiaca mentioned a pharaoh "Onnos" reigning for 33 years at the end of the Fifth Dynasty. Onnos is believed to be the hellenized form for Unas, and Africanus' 33-year figure fits well with the 30 years of reign given to Unas on the Turin canon.

=== Contemporaneous sources ===
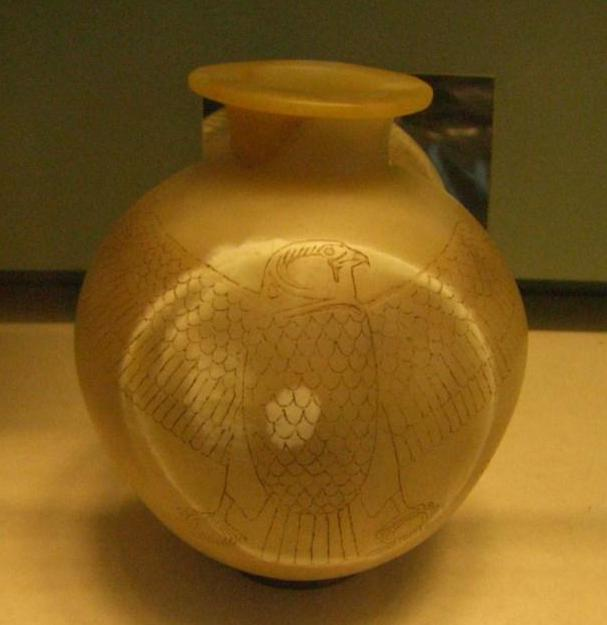
Alabaster globular vase of Unas, Louvre

The primary contemporaneous sources attesting to Unas's activities are the many reliefs from his pyramid complex. Excluding these, surprisingly few documents dating to Unas's reign have survived to this day, considering the 30-year length that later records give for his reign. Excavations at Abusir, the royal necropolis of the Fifth Dynasty, have produced only four dated inscriptions safely attributable to Unas. They explicitly mention his third, fourth, sixth and eighth years on the throne. Unas also left a rock inscription on the island of Elephantine, next to the First Cataract of the Nile in Nubia.

In addition, several alabaster vases bearing Unas's cartouche are known. A complete vessel and additional fragments originating from Byblos on the Levantine coast are now in the National Museum of Beirut. A vase of unknown provenance is located in the National Archaeological Museum of Florence and reads "Horus Wadjtawy, living eternally, king of Upper and Lower Egypt, son of Ra, Unas, living eternally". (Note: Inventory number 3253.) Another vessel, of unknown origins, is on display at the Louvre Museum. It is a 17-centimetre-tall (6.7 in), 13.2-centimetre-wide (5.2 in) globular alabaster vase finely decorated with a falcon with outstretched wings and two uraei, or rearing cobras, holding ankh signs surrounding Unas's cartouche. An ointment jar bearing Unas's cartouche and Horus name is in the Brooklyn Museum. Finally, a fragment of a calcite vase rim bearing two cartouches of Unas is on display in the Petrie Museum. (Note: Reference number UC13258.)

== Family ==
Unas assumed the throne at the death of his predecessor Djedkare Isesi. Djedkare is thought to have been Unas's father, despite of the complete lack of evidence bearing on the question. The succession from Djedkare Isesi to Unas seems to have been smooth.

Unas had at least two queens, Nebet and Khenut, who were buried in a large double mastaba adjacent to their husband's pyramid.

=== Children with unknown spouse(s) ===
Unas had at least five daughters.

- Hemetre Hemi
- Khentkaues
- Neferut
- Nefertkaues Iku
- Sesheshet Idut

=== Possible children with Nebet ===
- Unas-Ankh (died c. 2365 BC): Unas and Nebet possibly had a son, the "king's son", "royal chamberlain", "priest of Maat" and "overseer of Upper Egypt". He died around 10 years into Unas's reign. The filiation of Unas-Ankh is indirectly hinted at by his name and titles and by the presence of his tomb near those of Nebet and Unas but is not universally accepted. (Note: In particular the title of "king's son" was given to both actual royal sons and non-royal high officials.)

=== Possible children with Nebet or Khenut ===
- Iput (c. 2375 BC – c. 2325 BC)

=== Possible children with unknown spouse(s) ===
Two other sons have been proposed, but these filiations are conjectural and contested. Unas likely died without a male heir.

- Nebkauhor
- Shepsespuptah

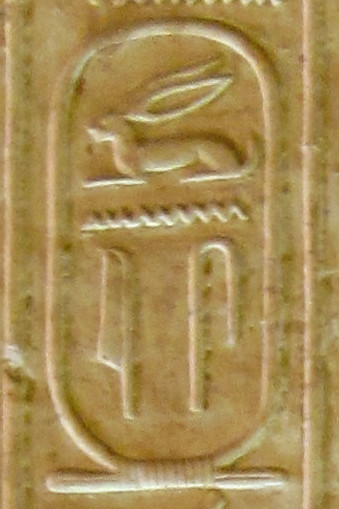
Cartouche of king Unas

== Reign ==
=== Duration ===
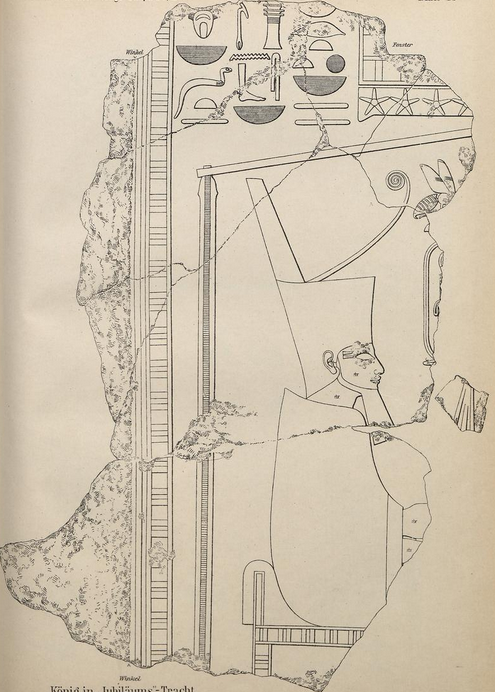
Relief of Sahure wearing the tunic of the Sed festival, similar to the relief depicting Unas's Sed festival from his mortuary complex

The duration of Unas's reign is uncertain. As indicated above, historical sources credit him with 30 and 33 years on the throne, figures that have been adopted by many Egyptologists, including Flinders Petrie, William C. Hayes, Darrell Baker, Peter Munro, and Jaromir Malek. In favor of such a long reign are scenes of a Sed festival found in Unas's mortuary temple. This festival was normally celebrated only after 30 years of reign and was meant to rejuvenate the pharaoh's strength and power. Mere depictions of the festival do not necessarily imply a long reign, however. For example, a relief showing pharaoh Sahure in the tunic of the Sed festival has been found in his mortuary temple, although both historical sources and archeological evidence agree that he ruled Egypt for less than 14 full years.

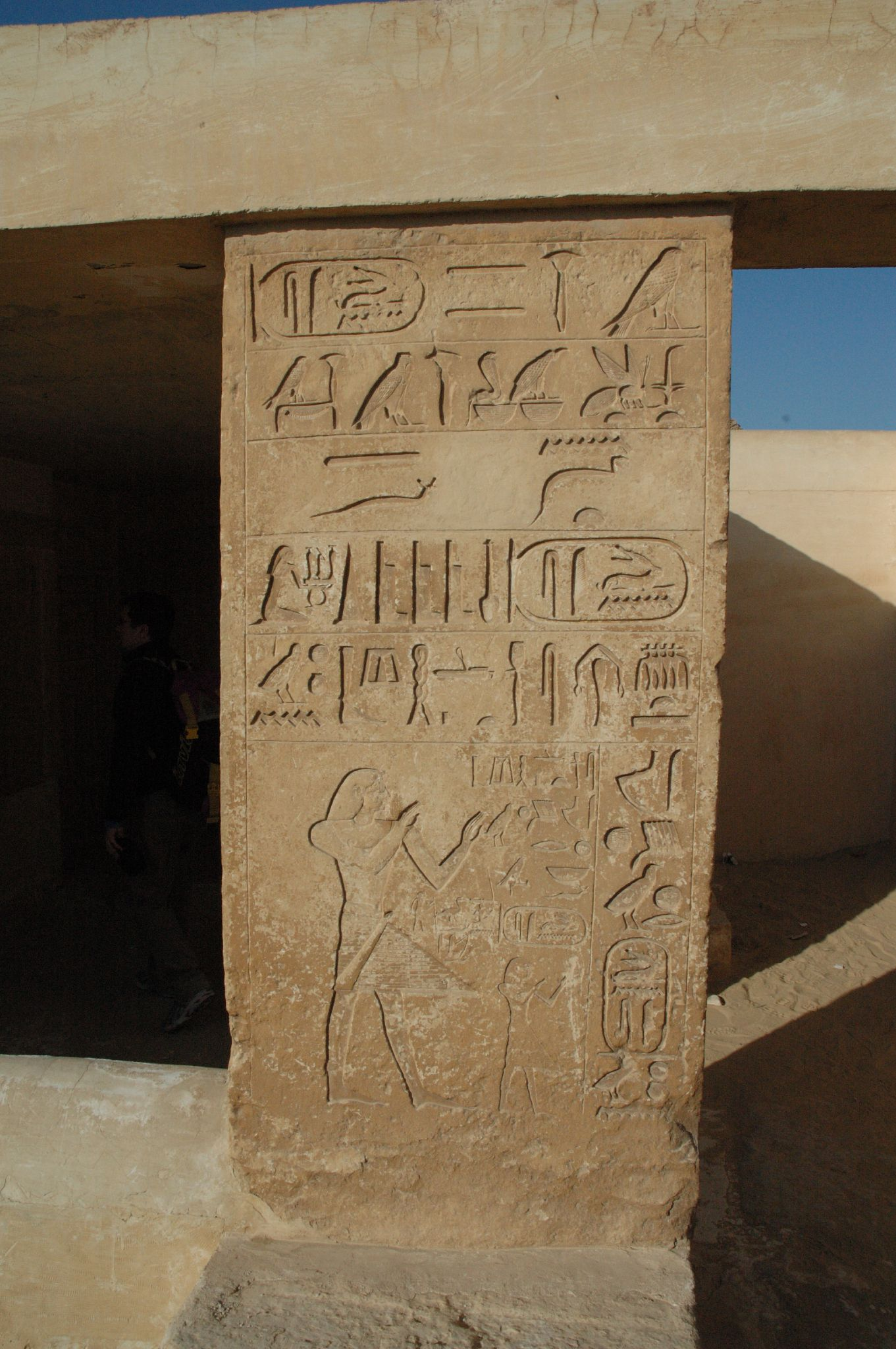
Saqqara mastabas. Unas cartouches.

Other Egyptologists suspect a reign of less than 30 years for Unas, owing to the scarcity of artefacts datable to his reign as well as the lack of documents dated to beyond his eighth year on the throne. Hence, Jürgen von Beckerath believes that Unas ruled Egypt for 20 years while Rolf Krauss, David Warburton and Erik Hornung shortened this number to 15 years in their 2012 study of Egyptian chronology. Krauss and Miroslav Verner further question the credibility of the Turin Canon concerning the Fourth and Fifth Dynasties, so that the 30-year figure credited to Unas by the canon might not be reliable.

Excavations of the tomb of Nikau-Isesi under the direction of Naguib Kanawati at Saqqara have yielded evidence in support of a shorter reign. Nikau-Isesi was an official who started his career during the reign of Djedkare Isesi. He lived through that of Unas and died as overseer of Upper-Egypt under Unas's successor Teti. Nikau-Isesi is known to have died on the year of the eleventh cattle count during Teti's reign, an event consisting of counting the livestock throughout the country to evaluate the amount of taxes to be levied. It is traditionally believed that such counts occurred every two years during the Old Kingdom and every year during the later Middle Kingdom (c. 2055 – c. 1650 BC). Thus, Nikau-Isesi would have lived for 22 years after Teti took the throne and together with the 30 years of reign credited to Unas, would have died past 70 years old. However, forensic examination of his mummy yielded an age at death of no more than 45 years old. This suggests that the cattle count occurred more than once every two years during Unas and Teti's time, possibly irregularly. If so, Unas's 30-year figure on the Turin canon, understood to mean 15 cattle counts, could translate into as little as 15 years, which together with just 11 years during Teti's reign would account for Nikau-Isesi's death at around 40 to 45 years of age.

=== Activities ===
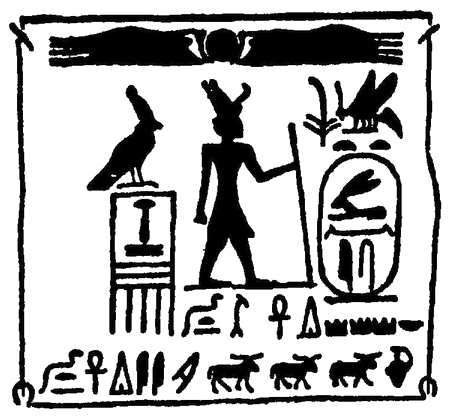
Drawing of the rock inscription of Unas on Elephantine (Note: The text of the inscription reads "Horus Wadjtawy, the king of Upper and Lower Egypt Unas, lord of the foreign lands, given life and dominion for ever, beloved of Khnum, given life for ever".)

Trade and warfare

Owing to the scarcity of evidence dating to Unas's reign, we know very little about his activities. Existing trade relations with foreign countries and cities, in particular Byblos, seem to have continued during Unas's time on the throne. Reliefs from the causeway of his pyramid complex show two large seagoing ships coming back from an expedition to the Levantine coast with Syro-Canaanite men, who were either the boat crews or slaves. Another relief depicts a military campaign, Egyptians armed with bows and daggers attacking Canaanite nomads called the Shasu. Similar reliefs have been found in preceding pyramid complexes, such as that of Sahure, and they may thus be standard themes rather than depictions of actual events. Other sources tend to confirm the accuracy of these depictions; for example, the autobiography of Weni relates many punitive raids against Canaanite nomads in the early Sixth Dynasty.

To the South of Egypt, inscriptions of Unas on Elephantine record a visit of the king to Lower Nubia, possibly to receive tribute from local chieftains or because of growing unrest in the region. In addition, a relief from the causeway of Unas leading to his pyramid shows a giraffe, suggesting trade relations with Nubia.

Domestic

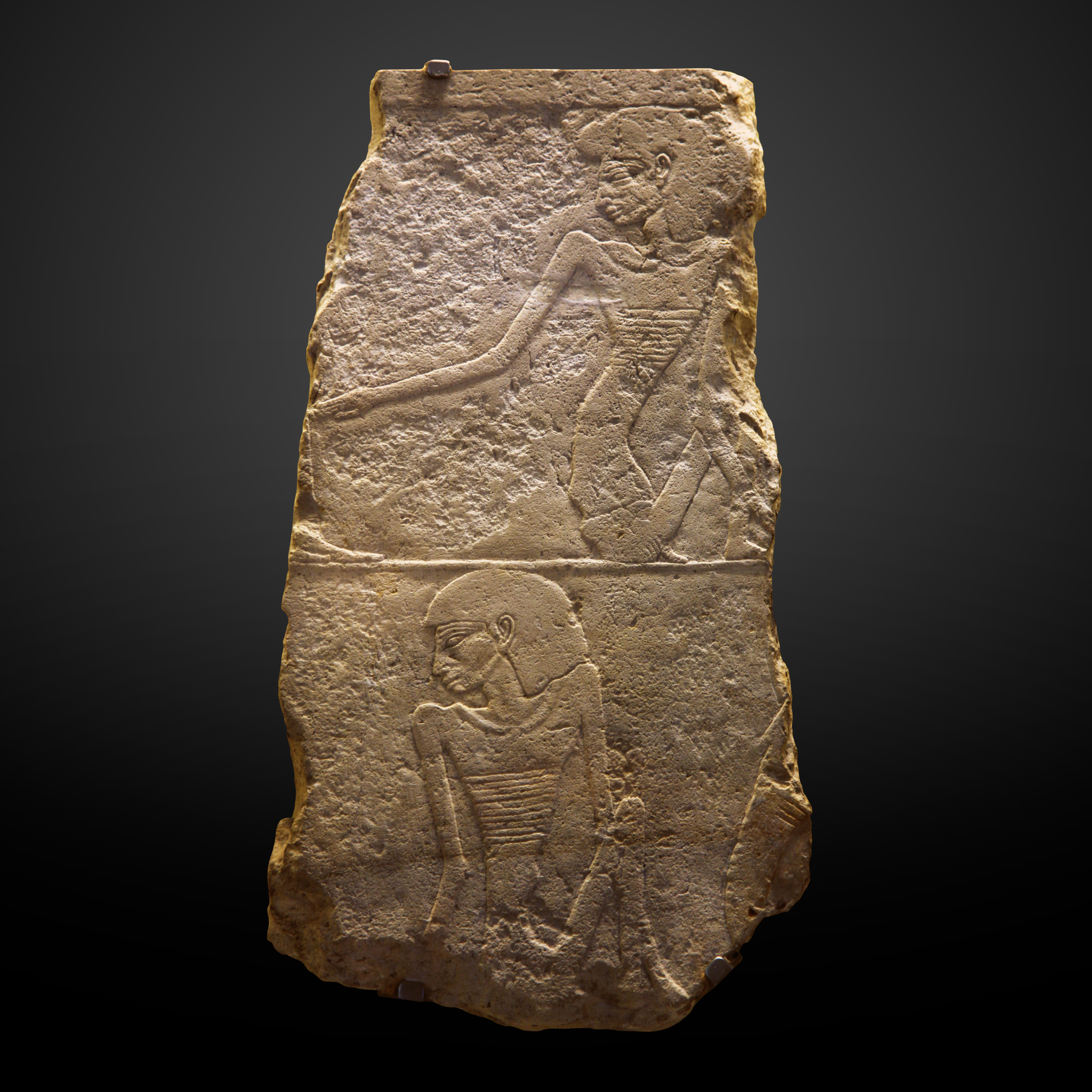
Relief showing starving nomads from Unas's causeway at Saqqara

Unas's reign was a time of economic decline although, as the French Egyptologist Nicolas Grimal writes, it was "by no means a time of decadence". Indeed, the Egyptian state was still capable of mounting important expeditions to provide building stones for the king's pyramid complex. These expeditions are depicted on unique reliefs found in Unas's causeway and are also referred to in the autobiographical stela of an administration official. (Note: Stela CG 1433, Egyptian Museum, Cairo.) This official reports the transport of 10.40-metre-tall (34.1-foot) palmiform (Note: A palmiform column is a column whose capital has the form of palm leaves. This style is for example present in the mortuary complex of king Sahure.) columns of red granite from Elephantine to Saqqara in only four days, a feat for which he was praised by the king. In addition to the important construction works undertaken in Saqqara for the construction of his pyramid complex, building activities also took place on Elephantine.

Until 1996, the domestic situation during Unas's reign was thought to have been disastrous, based on reliefs from the causeway of his pyramid complex showing emaciated people and thus suggesting times of famine. This changed when excavations at Abusir in 1996 yielded similar reliefs in the mortuary complex of Sahure, who reigned at a prosperous time in the early Fifth Dynasty. In addition, research showed that the starving people are likely to be desert dwellers, nomads distinguished by their specific hair-style, rather than Egyptians. Thus, these reliefs are now understood to be standard representations of the generosity of the king towards the destitute and of the hardships of life in the desert regions bordering Egypt rather than referring to actual events.

=== Death and end of a dynasty ===
In his history of Egypt, Manetho states that with the death of Unas the Fifth Dynasty came to an end. This may be because Unas died without a male heir, his probable son Unas-Ankh having predeceased him. This might have caused a succession crisis hinted at by the personal name chosen by Teti upon his accession to the throne: "Seheteptawy" meaning "He who reconciles/pacifies the two lands". Teti's claim to the throne could have relied on his marriage to Iput, who may have been a daughter of Unas. This possibility is heavily debated, as the interpretation of Iput's titles that would indicate that she was the daughter of a king is uncertain. (Note: Iput held the title of z3t nswt-bjtj, which literally means "Daughter of the king of Upper and Lower Egypt". However, this title could equally well be a variant of z3t-ntjr, meaning that she was the mother of a king (Pepi I)) Furthermore, the idea that Teti could legitimate his claim by marrying into the royal family is rejected by many Egyptologists, including Munro, Dobrev, Baud, Mertz, Pirenne, and Robin, who do not think that the right to the pharaonic throne passed through the female line.

In addition to Manetho's statement, the Turin king list presents a special break point between Unas and his successor Teti. Although the king list is not organized in dynasties–which were invented by Manetho–the Egyptologist Jaromir Malek explains that "the criterion for such divisions in the Turin Canon invariably was the change of location of the capital and royal residence." Malek thus suggests that the capital of Egypt, then known as Inbu-Hedj, (Note: Inbu-Hedj means "White Walls".) was indeed supplanted at the time by settlements located to the South, East of South Saqqara, where Unas's palace may have been located. In the second millennium BC these cities finally merged and gave rise to Memphis. (Note: From "Mennefer", meaning "Perfect and enduring", the name of the pyramid of Pepi I next to which Mennefer was located.)

Whatever the basis for Manetho's choice to end the Fifth Dynasty with Unas, Egyptians living at the time probably perceived no particular change from one dynasty to the next. The administration of the state shows no evidence of disturbances, with many officials continuing their careers from Unas's onto Teti's reign. These include the viziers Mehu, Kagemni and Nikau-Isesi and the overseer of the province of Edfu Isi. Given that the Egyptians of the Old Kingdom might not have conceived of dynasties, the distinction between the Fifth and Sixth Dynasties might be illusory.

== Evolution of religion and kingship ==
The reigns of Djedkare Isesi and of Unas were a time of changes in Ancient Egyptian religion and in the ideology of kingship, changes that are first demonstrable under Unas. A statistical analysis of clay seal fragments bearing Horus names of pharaohs of the Fifth Dynasty points to a marked decline of the cult of the king during Unas's time on the throne. This continued under Unas's successor Teti, for whom we know only two seals bearing his Horus name. This trend reflects the lessening of the king's power in conjunction with the growth of the administration and priesthood.

Meanwhile, the cult of Osiris was becoming more important with this god replacing the king as the guarantor of life after death for the pharaoh's subjects. The German Egyptologist Hartwig Altenmüller writes that for an Egyptian of the time "the [...] afterlife no longer depends on the relationship between the individual mortal and the king, [...] instead it is linked to his ethical position in direct relation to Osiris". In contrast, the cult of the sun god Ra was in apparent decline, even though Ra was still the most important deity of the Egyptian pantheon. Thus, Djedkare Isesi and Unas did not build a sun temple in contrast with most of their Fifth Dynasty predecessors. In addition, the names of Menkauhor Kaiu and Unas do not incorporate any reference to Ra, in rupture with a tradition which held since the reign of Userkaf, about a century earlier. The Pyramid Texts found in Unas's pyramid demonstrate the importance of Osiris and Ra in ancient Egyptian religion at the time. Both gods were believed to play the key roles in accessing the afterlife, with Ra as the source of life and Osiris as the force through which the next life would be attained. (Note: Another important religious work, the Memphite Theology, may have been written during the reign of Unas. The Memphite Theology is a story of the creation of the world and of the religious and social order of ancient Egypt through the word and will of the god Ptah. The king himself is described as the personified Horus and an aspect of Ptah. It is now widely believed, however, that this theological text dates to either to the 19th Dynasty or to the much later 25th Dynasty (760–656 BC).)

== Pyramid complex ==
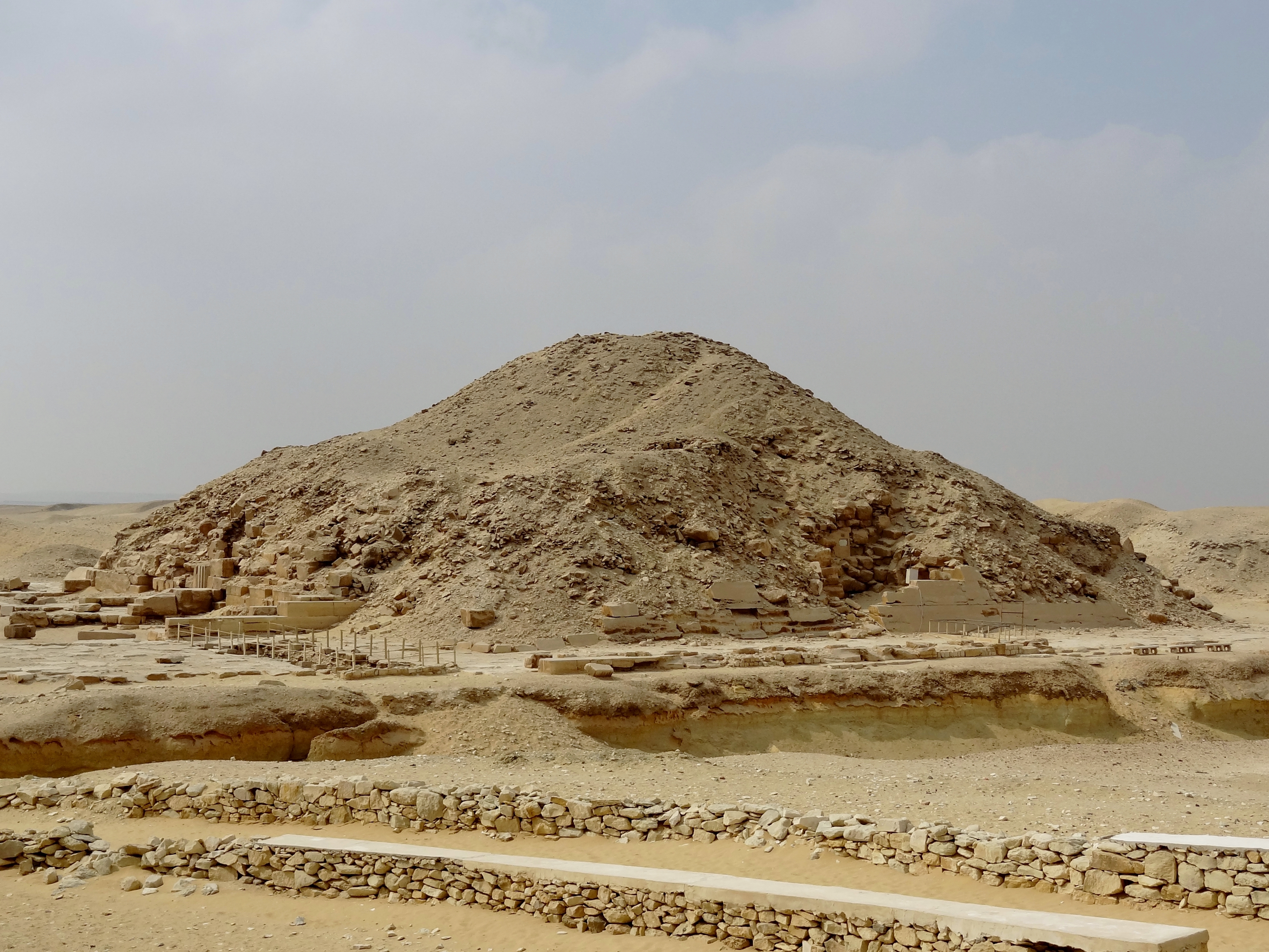
The pyramid of Unas at Saqqara

Unas had a pyramid built for himself in North Saqqara, between the pyramid of Sekhemkhet and the southwestern corner of the pyramid complex of Djoser, in symmetry with the pyramid of Userkaf located at the northeastern corner. In the process, workers leveled and covered older tombs located in the area, most notably the tomb of the Second Dynasty king Hotepsekhemwy (c. 2890 BC).

The original Egyptian name of the pyramid was "Nefer Isut Unas", meaning "Beautiful are the places of Unas". The pyramid of Unas is the smallest of the pyramids completed during the Old Kingdom, having a square base of 57.7 m × 57.7 m (189 ft × 189 ft) for a height of 43 m (141 ft).

=== Mortuary complex ===
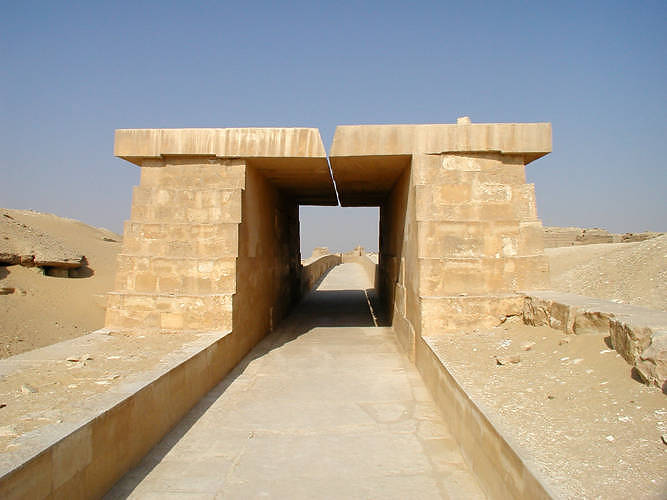
A restored section of the causeway of Unas

The pyramid of Unas is part of a larger mortuary complex built around it. It was approached via an ancient lake on the shores of which Unas's valley temple was located. This temple received the provisions for the cult of the king and the offerings to be made were prepared there. At the back of the valley temple was the beginning of a 750-metre (2,460-foot) causeway, equaled only by that of Khufu, and leading to an upper temple adjacent to the pyramid. A thin slit in the roof of the causeway allowed the light to illuminate its walls covered for their entire length in painted reliefs. These depicted the Egyptian seasons, processions of people from the nomes of Egypt, craftsmen at work, offerings bearers, battle scenes and the transport of granite columns for the construction of the pyramid complex.

At the end of the causeway was a large hall leading to a pillared open court surrounded by magazine chambers. The court led into the mortuary temple proper which housed statues of the king and where the offerings to the deceased took place. This was immediately adjacent to the eastern side of the pyramid, which was surrounded by an enclosure wall defining the sacred space. At the southeast corner of the enclosure was a small satellite pyramid for the Ka of the king. The internal chambers of the pyramid were entered in 1881 by Gaston Maspero, who thus discovered the pyramid texts. The burial chamber housed nothing but a black greywacke sarcophagus sunk into the floor and a canopic chest. The sarcophagus proved to contain scattered bones, which may belong to Unas.

=== Pyramid Texts ===
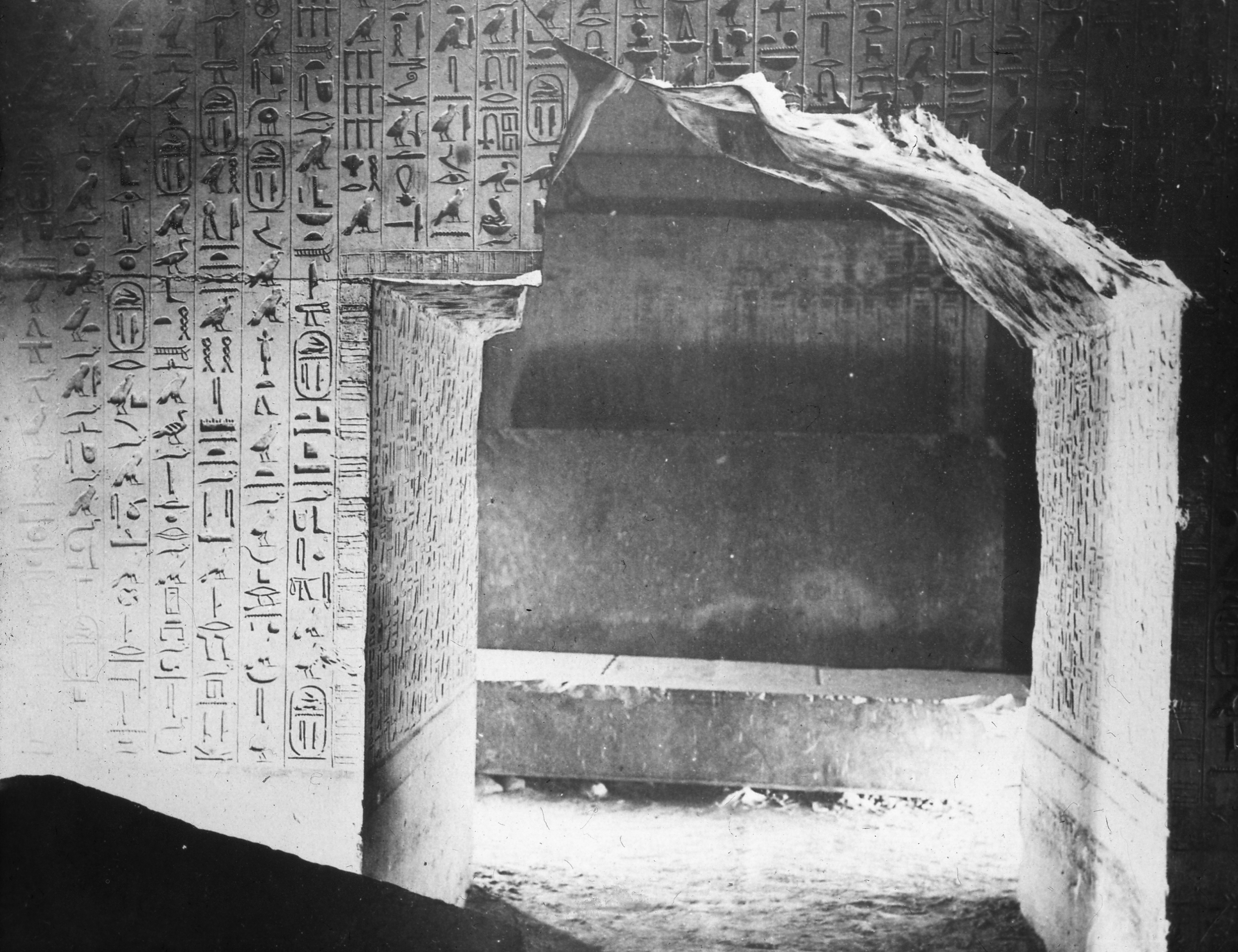
The Pyramid Texts inscribed on the walls of Unas's burial chamber

The main innovation of the pyramid of Unas is the first appearance of the Pyramid Texts, one of the oldest religious texts in Egypt to have survived to this day. (Note: Note that the archaic style of certain sections of the Pyramid Texts indicate that these are much older than Unas's reign.) In doing so, Unas initiated a tradition that would be followed in the pyramid of the kings and queens of the Sixth to Eighth Dynasties, until the end of the Old Kingdom circa 200 years later.

In total 283 magical spells, (Note: The number reported differs from scholar to scholar. Clayton mentions 228 spells; Allen gives 236.) also known as utterances, were carved and the signs painted blue on the walls of the corridor, antechamber, and burial chamber of Unas's pyramid. They constitute the most complete rendition of the Pyramid Texts existing today. These spells were intended to help the king in overcoming hostile forces and powers in the Underworld and thus join with the sun god Ra, his divine father in the afterlife. By writing the texts on the walls of the pyramid's internal chambers, the architects of Unas's pyramid ensured that the king would benefit from their potency even if the funerary cult was to cease. Hence, the Pyramid Texts of the pyramid of Unas incorporate instructions for ritual actions and words to be spoken, suggesting that they were precisely those performed and recited during the cult of the king in his mortuary temple.

The good preservation of the texts in Unas's pyramid shows that they were arranged so as to be read by the Ba of Unas, as it arose from the sarcophagus thanks to resurrection utterances and surrounded by protective spells and ritual offerings. The Ba would then leave the burial chamber, which incorporates texts identifying the king with Osiris in the Duat, and would move to the antechamber symbolizing the Akhet. Included in the spells written on the walls of the antechamber of Unas are two utterances known as the Cannibal Hymn, which portrays the pharaoh as flying to heaven through a stormy sky and eating both gods and men. In doing so the king would receive the life force of the gods. (Note: While most historians believe that it is unlikely that Unas himself engaged in cannibalism, the Egyptologist Ernest Alfred Wallis Budge proposed that the Cannibal Hymn may harken back to an earlier time in Egyptian history when cannibalism was in fact practiced.) (Note: This inspired the American technical death metal band Nile, which recorded an 11:43-long song titled "Unas, Slayer of the Gods" based on the Cannibal Hymn. It appears on their 2002 album In Their Darkened Shrines.) At this point the Ba of Unas would face east, the direction of the sunrise, and beyond the pyramid masonry, the false door of the mortuary temple where funerary rituals were performed. Finally, turning left the Ba would join Ra in the sky by passing through the pyramid corridor.

An example of a spell from the pyramid of Unas is Utterance 217:

Re-Atum, this Unas comes to you
A spirit indestructible
Your son comes to you
This Unas comes to you
May you cross the sky united in the dark
May you rise in lightland, the place in which you shine!

== Legacy ==
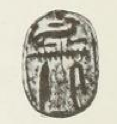
Scarab bearing Unas's name

Unas's most immediate legacy is his funerary cult, which continued at least until the end of the Old Kingdom. This cult is attested by the tombs at Saqqara of seven priests responsible for the religious duties to be performed in the funerary complex. Three of these tombs date to the early Sixth Dynasty in the time following the death of Pepi I. Three more tombs date to the reign of Pepi II and the last one dates to the very end of the Old Kingdom (c. 2180 BC). The priests of the cult of Unas adopted basilophorous names, incorporating that of the king, possibly upon taking office.

Unas's funerary cult appears to have survived during the chaotic First Intermediate Period until the Middle Kingdom. By the time of the 12th Dynasty (c. 1990–c. 1800 BC), the lector-priest Unasemsaf (Note: Unasemsaf means "Unas is his protection".) and his family were involved in the cult of Unas. In spite of this, Unas's funerary complex was partially dismantled and its materials reemployed for the construction of Amenemhat I and Senusret I's own pyramid complexes.

In addition to his official cult, Unas was deified and became a local god of the Saqqara necropolis. Grimal attributes this directly to the grandeur of his funerary complex. Malek doubts the existence of a popular cult of Unas during the Old Kingdom but acknowledges it from the Middle Kingdom onwards. He attributes this Middle Kingdom revival to the geographic position of Unas's complex making it a natural gateway to the Saqqara necropolis. The popular cult of the deified Unas continued for nearly 2,000 years as shown by the numerous scarabs bearing Unas's name found in Saqqara and dated from the New Kingdom (c. 1550–c. 1077 BC) until the Late Period (664–332 BC). The epicenter of this cult was not the pyramid of Unas nor the associated mortuary temple but rather the statues of the king in the valley temple. This activity could explain why the pyramid complex of Unas was the object of restoration works under the impulse of Prince Khaemweset, a son of Ramesses II (1279–1213 BC).

== Bibliography ==
- Allen, James; Allen, Susan; Anderson, Julie; Arnold, Arnold; Arnold, Dorothea; Cherpion, Nadine; David, Élisabeth; Grimal, Nicolas; Grzymski, Krzysztof; Hawass, Zahi; Hill, Marsha; Jánosi, Peter; Labée-Toutée, Sophie; Labrousse, Audran; Lauer, Jean-Phillippe; Leclant, Jean; Der Manuelian, Peter; Millet, N. B.; Oppenheim, Adela; Craig Patch, Diana; Pischikova, Elena; Rigault, Patricia; Roehrig, Catharine H.; Wildung, Dietrich; Ziegler, Christiane (1999). Egyptian Art in the Age of the Pyramids. New York: The Metropolitan Museum of Art. ISBN 978-0-8109-6543-0. OCLC 41431623.
- Allen, James (2001). "Pyramid Texts". In Redford, Donald B. (ed.). The Oxford Encyclopedia of Ancient Egypt. Vol. 3. Oxford University Press. pp. 95–98. ISBN 978-0-19-510234-5.
- Allen, James; Der Manuelian, Peter (2005). The ancient Egyptian pyramid texts. Writings from the Ancient World. Vol. 23. Atlanta: Society of Biblical Literature. ISBN 978-1-58983-182-7.
- Altenmüller, Hartwig (1974). "Zur Vergöttlichung des Königs Unas im Alten Reich". Studien zur Altägyptischen Kultur (in German). 1: 1–18.
- Altenmüller, Hartwig (2001). "Old Kingdom: Fifth Dynasty". In Redford, Donald B. (ed.). The Oxford Encyclopedia of Ancient Egypt. Vol. 2. Oxford University Press. pp. 597–601. ISBN 978-0-19-510234-5.
- Arieh Tobin, Vincent (2001). "Myths: Creation Myths". In Redford, Donald B. (ed.). The Oxford Encyclopedia of Ancient Egypt. Vol. 2. Oxford University Press. pp. 469–472. ISBN 978-0-19-510234-5.
- Arnold, Dorothea (19 July 1999). "Old Kingdom Chronology and List of Kings". Metropolitan Museum of Art.
- Baker, Darrell (2008). The Encyclopedia of the Pharaohs. Vol. I - Predynastic to the Twentieth Dynasty 3300–1069 BC. Stacey International. ISBN 978-1-905299-37-9.
- Barsanti, Alessandro (1901). "Rapports de M. Alexandre Barsanti sur les déblaiements opérés autour de la pyramide d'Ounas pendant les années 1899–1901". Annales du Service des Antiquités de l'Égypte (in French). Cairo: Imprimerie de l'institut français d'archéologie orientale: 244–257. ISSN 1687-1510. OCLC 1189841.
- Baud, Michel (1999). Famille Royale et pouvoir sous l'Ancien Empire égyptien. Tome 2 (PDF). Bibliothèque d'étude 126/2 (in French). Cairo: Institut français d'archéologie orientale. ISBN 978-2-7247-0250-7. Archived from the original (PDF) on 2 April 2015.
- Baud, Michel; Dobrev, Vassil (1995). "De nouvelles annales de l'Ancien Empire Egyptien. Une "Pierre de Palerme" pour la VIe dynastie" (PDF). Bulletin de l'Institut Français d'Archéologie Orientale (in French). 95: 23–92. Archived from the original (PDF) on 2 April 2015.
- von Beckerath, Jürgen (1999). Handbuch der ägyptischen Königsnamen. Münchner ägyptologische Studien, Heft 49 (in German). Mainz: Philip von Zabern. ISBN 978-3-8053-2591-2.
- Borchardt, Ludwig (1913). Das Grabdenkmal des Königs S'aḥu-Re (in German). Vol. (Band 2): Die Wandbilder: Abbildungsblätter. Leipzig: Hinrichs. ISBN 978-3-535-00577-1.
- "Fragmentary Ointment Jar Inscribed for Unas". Online database of the Brooklyn Museum. Archived from the original on 11 February 2018.
- Brunton, Guy (2015). "Vase UC13258 of Unas". Online catalog of the Petrie Museum.
- Budge, Ernest Alfred Wallis (1988). From fetish to God in ancient Egypt (Reprint. Originally published: London: Oxford University Press, 1934 ed.). New York: Dover Publications. ISBN 978-0-486-25803-4.
- Clayton, Peter (1994). Chronicle of the Pharaohs. Thames & Hudson. ISBN 978-0-500-05074-3.
- Coulon, Laurent (2008). "Famine". Department of Near Eastern Languages and Cultures. UCLA Encyclopedia of Egyptology. University of California – Los Angeles.
- Dodson, Aidan (1995). Monarchs of the Nile. London: Rubicon Press. ISBN 978-0-948695-21-6.
- Dodson, Aidan; Hilton, Dyan (2004). The Complete Royal Families of Ancient Egypt. London: Thames & Hudson Ltd. ISBN 978-0-500-05128-3.
- Dorman, Peter (2015). "The 5th dynasty (c. 2465–c. 2325 bc)". Encyclopædia Britannica Online.
- "Unas". Digital Egypt for Universities. 2000.
- Fischer, Henry (1975). "Two Tantalizing Biographical Fragments of Historical Interest". The Journal of Egyptian Archaeology. 61: 33–37. doi:10.1177/030751337506100104. S2CID 192254681.
- Gardiner, Alan (1959). The Royal Canon of Turin. Griffith Institute. OCLC 21484338.
- Goedicke, Hans (1971). Re-Used Blocks from the Pyramid of Amenemhet I at Lisht. New York: Metropolitan Museum of Art, Egyptian Expedition. ISBN 978-0-87099-107-3.
- Grimal, Nicolas (1992). A History of Ancient Egypt. Translated by Shaw, Ian. Oxford: Blackwell publishing. ISBN 978-0-631-19396-8.
- Guidotti, M. Cristina (1991). Vasi dall'epoca protodinastica al nuovo regno. Cataloghi dei musei e gallerie d'Italia (in Italian). Rome: Istituto poligrafico e Zecca dello Stato : Libreria dello Stato. ISBN 978-88-240-0177-9.
- Gundlach, Rolf (2001). "Temples". In Redford, Donald B. (ed.). The Oxford Encyclopedia of Ancient Egypt, Volume 3. Oxford University Press. pp. 363–379. ISBN 978-0-19-510234-5.
- Hawass, Zahi; Verner, Miroslav (1996). "Newly discovered blocks from the causeway of Sahure (Archaeological report)". Mitteilungen des Deutschen Archäologischen Instituts. Abteilung Kairo. 52: 177–186.
- Hawass, Zahi; Senussi, Ashraf (2008). Old Kingdom Pottery from Giza. American University in Cairo Press. ISBN 978-977-305-986-6.
- Hayes, William (1978). The Scepter of Egypt: A Background for the Study of the Egyptian Antiquities in The Metropolitan Museum of Art. Vol. 1, From the Earliest Times to the End of the Middle Kingdom. New York: Metropolitan Museum of Art. OCLC 7427345.
- Hornung, Erik; Krauss, Rolf; Warburton, David, eds. (2012). Ancient Egyptian Chronology. Handbook of Oriental Studies. Leiden, Boston: Brill. ISBN 978-90-04-11385-5. ISSN 0169-9423.
- Jeffreys, David G. (2001). "Memphis". In Redford, Donald B. (ed.). The Oxford Encyclopedia of Ancient Egypt, Volume 2. Oxford University Press. pp. 373–376. ISBN 978-0-19-510234-5.
- Kanawati, Naguib (2001). "Nikauisesi, A Reconsideration of the Old Kingdom System of Dating" (PDF). The Rundle Foundation for Egyptian Archaeology, Newsletter. 75.
- Kanawati, Naguib; ʻAbd-ar-Rāziq, Maḥmūd (2000). The Teti Cemetery at Saqqara, Volume VI: The Tomb of Nikauisesi. Australian Centre for Egyptology; Reports. Vol. 14. Warminster: Aris & Phillips. ISBN 978-0-85668-819-5.
- Labrousse, Audran; Lauer, Jean Philippe; Leclant, Jean (1977). Le temple haut du complexe funéraire du roi Ounas. Bibliothèque d'étude, tome 73. Cairo: Institut français d'archéologie orientale du Caire. OCLC 5065554.
- Landström, Björn (1970). Ships of the Pharaohs: 4000 Years of Egyptian Shipbuilding. Garden City, N.Y.: Doubleday. OCLC 108769.
- Lehner, Mark (1997). The Complete Pyramids. New York: Thames & Hudson. ISBN 978-0-500-05084-2.
- Leprohon, Ronald J. (2013). The great name: ancient Egyptian royal titulary. Writings from the ancient world, no. 33. Atlanta: Society of Biblical Literature. ISBN 978-1-58983-736-2.
- Lichtheim, Miriam (1973). Ancient Egyptian literature. Volume 1: The Old and Middle Kingdoms. Berkeley: University of California Press. ISBN 978-0-520-02899-9.
- Lloyd, Alan (2010). Lloyd, Alan (ed.). A Companion to Ancient Egypt. Volume I. Wiley-Blackwell. ISBN 978-1-4051-5598-4.
- Malek, Jaromir (2000a). "The Old Kingdom (c.2160-2055 BC)". In Shaw, Ian (ed.). The Oxford History of Ancient Egypt. Oxford University Press. ISBN 978-0-19-815034-3.
- Malek, Jaromir (2000b). "Old Kingdom rulers as "local saints" in the Memphite area". In Bárta, Miroslav; Krejčí, Jaromír (eds.). Abusir and Saqqara in the Year 2000 (PDF). Prague: Academy of Sciences of the Czech Republic, Oriental Institute. pp. 241–258. ISBN 978-80-85425-39-0. Archived from the original (PDF) on 2011-02-01.
- Mariette, Auguste (1864). "La table de Saqqarah". Revue Archéologique (in French). 10. Paris: 168–186 & Pl. 17.
- "The Online Collection. Scarab, Unas". Metropolitan Museum of Art.
- Morales, Antonio J. (2006). "Traces of official and popular veneration to Nyuserra Iny at Abusir. Late Fifth Dynasty to the Middle Kingdom". In Bárta, Miroslav; Coppens, Filip; Krejčí, Jaromír (eds.). Abusir and Saqqara in the Year 2005, Proceedings of the Conference held in Prague (June 27–July 5, 2005). Prague: Academy of Sciences of the Czech Republic, Oriental Institute. pp. 311–341. ISBN 978-80-7308-116-4.
- Moussa, Ahmed Mahmoud (1971). "A Stela from Saqqara of a Family Devoted to the Cult of King Unas". Mitteilungen des Deutschen Archäologischen Instituts, Abteilung Kairo. 27: 81–84.
- Moussa, Ahmed Mahmoud; Altenmüller, Hartwig (1975). "Ein Denkmal zum Kult des Königs Unas am Ende der 12. Dynastie". Mitteilungen des Deutschen Archäologischen Instituts, Abteilung Kairo (in German). 31: 93–97.
- Munro, Peter (1993). Der Unas-Friedhof Nord-West (in German). Mainz am Rhein: von Zabern. OCLC 66014930.
- "Scarab with name of Unas". Museum of Fine Arts, Boston.
- Ockinga, Boyo G. (2010). "The Memphite Theology – Its Purpose and Date". In Woods, Alexandra; McFarlane, Ann; Binder, Susanne (eds.). Egyptian culture and society: studies in honour of Naguib Kanawati. Annales du Service des Antiquités de l'Égypte: Cahier 38, Volume II. Cairo: Conseil suprême des antiquitiés de l'Egypte. pp. 99–117. OCLC 705718659.
- Newberry, Percy (2003). Ancient Egyptian scarabs and cylinder seals: the Timins Collection. London: Kegan Paul International. ISBN 978-0-7103-0944-0.
- "Nile Unas Slayer Of The Gods lyrics". Music Song Lyrics. Archived from the original on February 10, 2018.
- Oakes, Lorna; Gahlin, Lucia (2002). Ancient Egypt: An Illustrated reference to the myths, religions, pyramids and temples of the Land of the Pharaohs. New York: Hermes House. ISBN 978-1-84309-429-6.
- Onderka, Pavel (2009). The Tomb of Unisankh at Saqqara and Chicago (Diploma). Charles University in Prague, Czech Institute of Egyptology. Archived from the original on 2015-04-02.
- Petrie, Flinders (1907). A History of Egypt. I. From the earliest times to the XVIth dynasty (Sixth ed.). OCLC 27060979.
- Petrie, Flinders (1917). Scarabs and cylinders with names, illustrated by the Egyptian collection in University College, London. Publications of the British School of Archaeology in Egypt, 29. London: School of Archaeology in Egypt. OCLC 3246026.
- Porter, Bertha; Moss, Rosalind; Burney, Ethel (1951). Topographical bibliography of ancient Egyptian hieroglyphic texts, reliefs, and paintings. VII, Nubia, the deserts, and outside Egypt (PDF) (1995 reprint ed.). Oxford: Griffith Institute. ISBN 978-0-900416-04-0.
- Rice, Michael (1999). Who is who in Ancient Egypt. Routledge London & New York. ISBN 978-0-203-44328-6.
- Richter, Barbara (2013). "Sed Festival Reliefs of the Old Kingdom". Paper Presented at the Annual Meeting of the 58th Annual Meeting of the American Research Center in Egypt, Wyndham Toledo Hotel, Toledo, Ohio, Apr 20, 2007.
- Schmitz, Bettina (1976). Untersuchungen zum Titel S3-NJŚWT "Königssohn". Habelts Dissertationsdrucke: Reihe Ägyptologie, Heft 2 (in German). Bonn: Habelt. ISBN 978-3-7749-1370-7.
- Sethe, Kurt Heinrich (1903). Urkunden des Alten Reichs (in German). wikipedia entry: Urkunden des Alten Reichs. Leipzig: J.C. Hinrichs. OCLC 846318602.
- Stevenson Smith, William (1971). "The Old Kingdom in Egypt". In Edwards, I. E. S.; Gadd, C. J.; Hammond, N. G. L. (eds.). The Cambridge Ancient History, Vol. 2, Part 2: Early History of the Middle East. Cambridge: Cambridge University Press. pp. 145–207. ISBN 978-0-521-07791-0.
- Strudwick, Nigel C. (2005). Texts from the Pyramid Age. Writings from the Ancient World (book 16). Atlanta: Society of Biblical Literature. ISBN 978-1-58983-680-8.
- Firenze e provincia. Guida d'Italia del T.C.I. Milano: Touring Club Italiano. 1993. ISBN 978-88-365-0533-3.
- "Vase with the name of king Unas". Global Egyptian Museum.
- Verner, Miroslav (2001a). "Archaeological Remarks on the 4th and 5th Dynasty Chronology" (PDF). Archiv Orientální. 69 (3): 363–418. Archived from the original (PDF) on 2016-03-04.
- Verner, Miroslav (2001b). "Old Kingdom: An Overview". In Redford, Donald B. (ed.). The Oxford Encyclopedia of Ancient Egypt, Volume 2. Oxford University Press. pp. 585–591. ISBN 978-0-19-510234-5.
- Verner, Miroslav (2001c). "Pyramid". In Redford, Donald B. (ed.). The Oxford Encyclopedia of Ancient Egypt, Volume 3. Oxford University Press. pp. 87–95. ISBN 978-0-19-513823-8.
- Verner, Miroslav (2001d). The Pyramids: The Mystery, Culture and Science of Egypt's Great Monuments. New York: Grove Press. ISBN 978-0-8021-1703-8.
- Verner, Miroslav (2003). Abusir: The Realm of Osiris. The American University in Cairo Press. ISBN 978-977-424-723-1.
- Wachsmann, Shelley (1998). Seagoing Ships and Seamanship in the Bronze Age Levant. College Station: Texas A & M University Press. ISBN 978-0-89096-709-6.
- Williams, Bruce (1981). Walsten, David (ed.). "The Tomb Chapels of Netjer-User and Unis-Ankh". Field Museum of Natural History Bulletin. Chicago: 26–32.

Preceded by Djedkare Isesi	King of Egypt c. 2375 - c. 2345 BC	Succeeded by Teti
