= Annales du service des antiquités de l'Égypte =

Research publication on Egyptology

The Annales du service des antiquités de l'Égypte (ASAE) (English: Annals of the Egyptian Antiquities Service) is a research publication focused on Egyptology that began in 1900. The work was published by the Egyptian Department of Antiquities (1900–1971), the Egyptian Antiquities Organization (1971–1993), and the Supreme Council of Antiquities (1993–2011). From 1988 until 1997, the publication was issued as Annales du Service des Antiquités Égyptiennes before reverting to its original name. Recent back issues of the periodical are currently sold by the American University in Cairo Press.
