= Mehu =

Ancient Egyptian vizier

- Vizier of Egypt
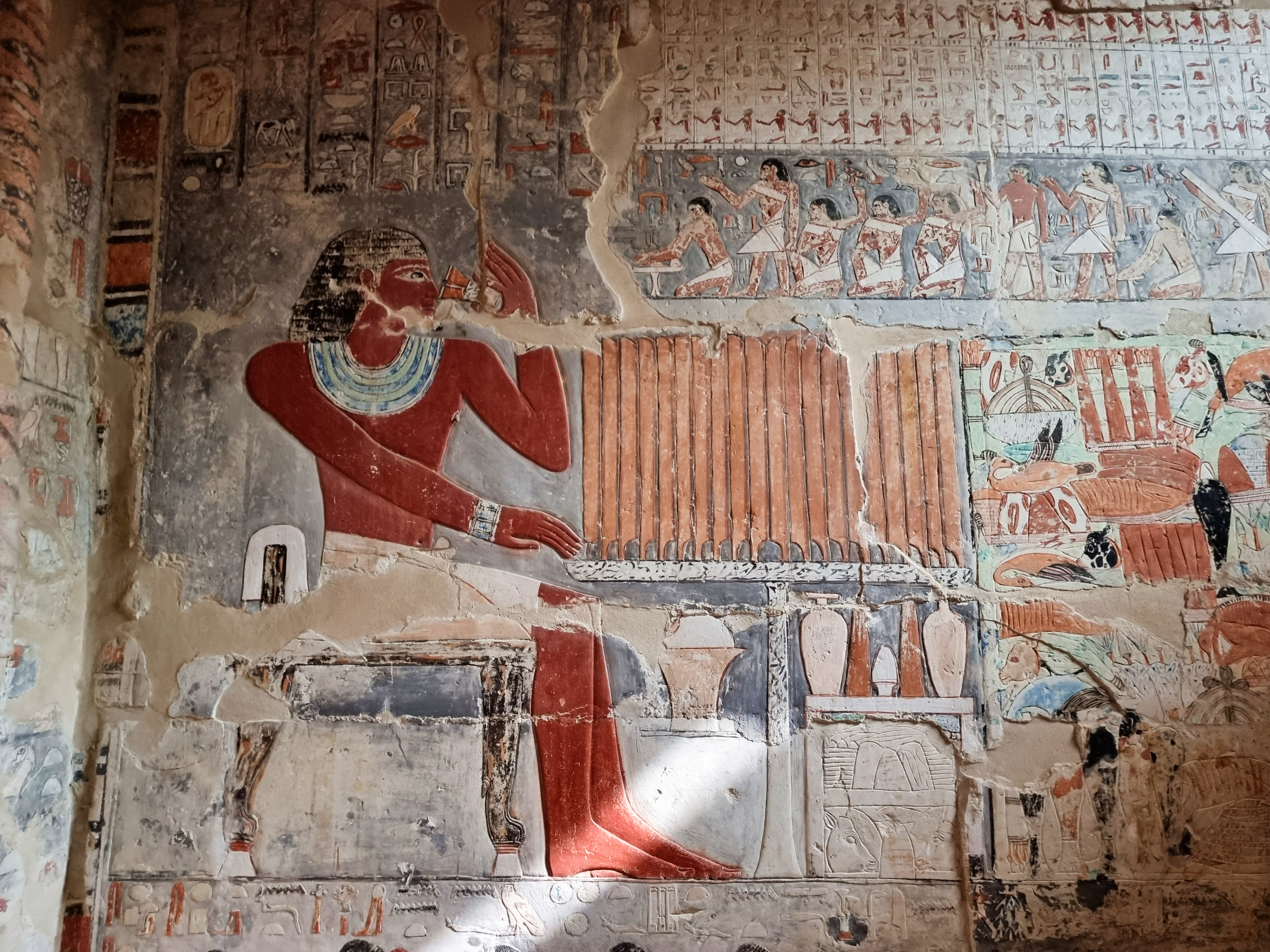
- Relief from Mehu's tomb
- Burial: Badrshein, Giza, Egypt
- Spouse: Nebet; Neferkaus
- Children: Merut; Khuy

Mehu was an Ancient Egyptian vizier who lived in the Sixth Dynasty. The office of the vizier was the most important one at the royal court. Mehu is mainly known from his monumental mastaba at Saqqara, not far away from the Pyramid of Unas.

The exact dating of Mehu is disputed in Egyptology. Hartwig Altenmüller published the relief decoration of the mastaba and dates him under king Teti. He argues that one of the brothers of Mehu with the name Iynefret is identical to another vizier also named Iynefret, who might date to the early Sixth Dynasty. Furthermore, Mehu carried the title of an overseer of priest at Djed-sut-Teti, that is the pyramid complex of king Teti. Other argue that he dates slightly later under king Pepi I.

Mehu's family, in particular his parents, remain unknown but he was very likely from Mendes. Mehu had two wives, Nebet and Neferkaus.

Mehu was bearing a high number of important titles. These include the titles of the vizier, but he was also Overseer of the treasuries, overseer of the double granary, overseer of Upper Egypt, and overseer of all royal works. Several sons are mentioned in the tomb. One son was perhaps called Mery, but his name was several times deleted. Another son was Hetepka. Within the mastaba of Mehu there are parts reserved for a vizier called Hetepka. It is possible that he was the son of Mehu, albeit final evidence for this identification is missing. The vizier Hetepka might have been just a member of Mehu's family. Two other known children of Mehu are a daughter called Merut and a further son called Khuy.

Mehu served under king Teti, Unas' successor.

== Gallery ==
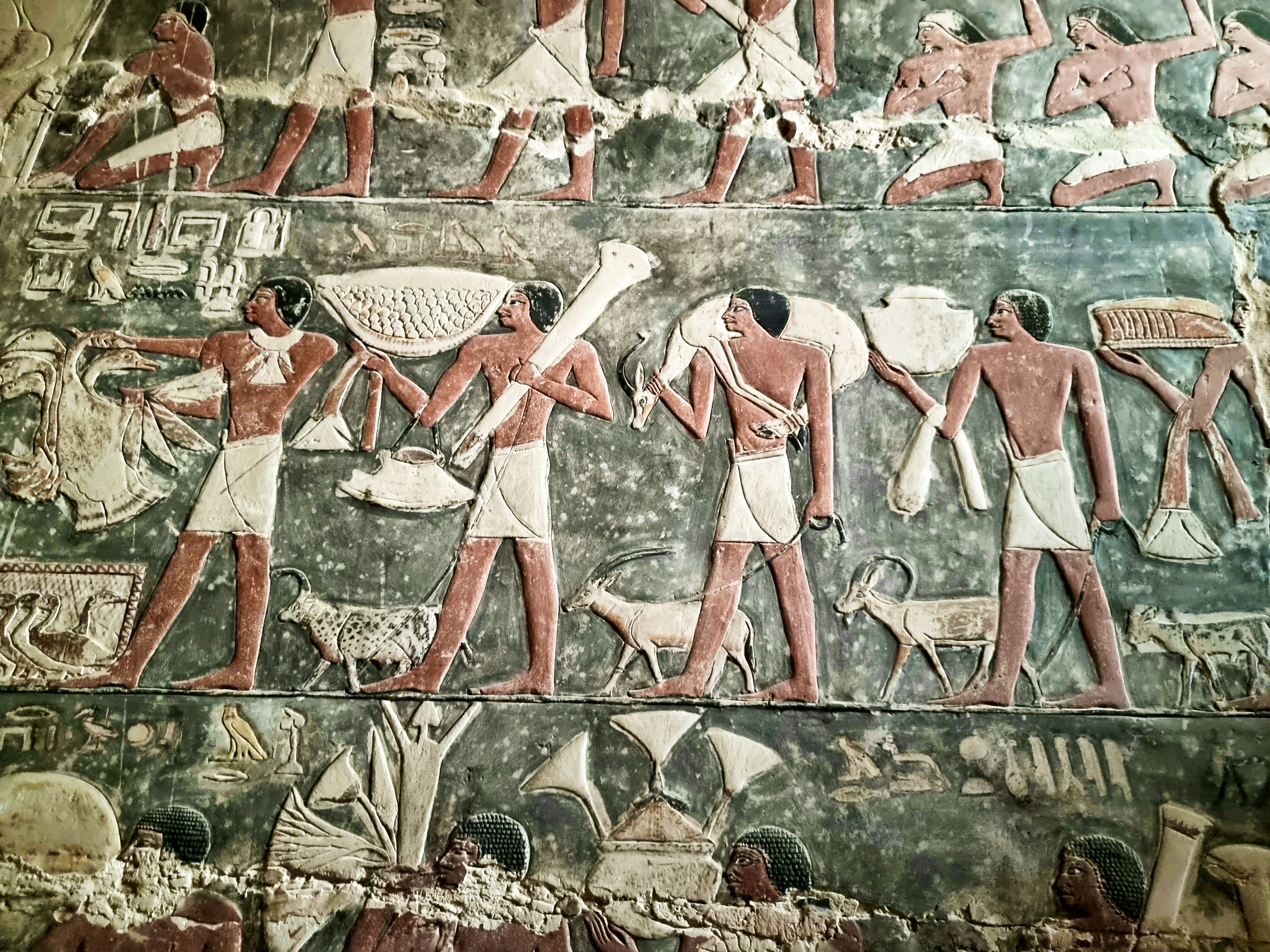

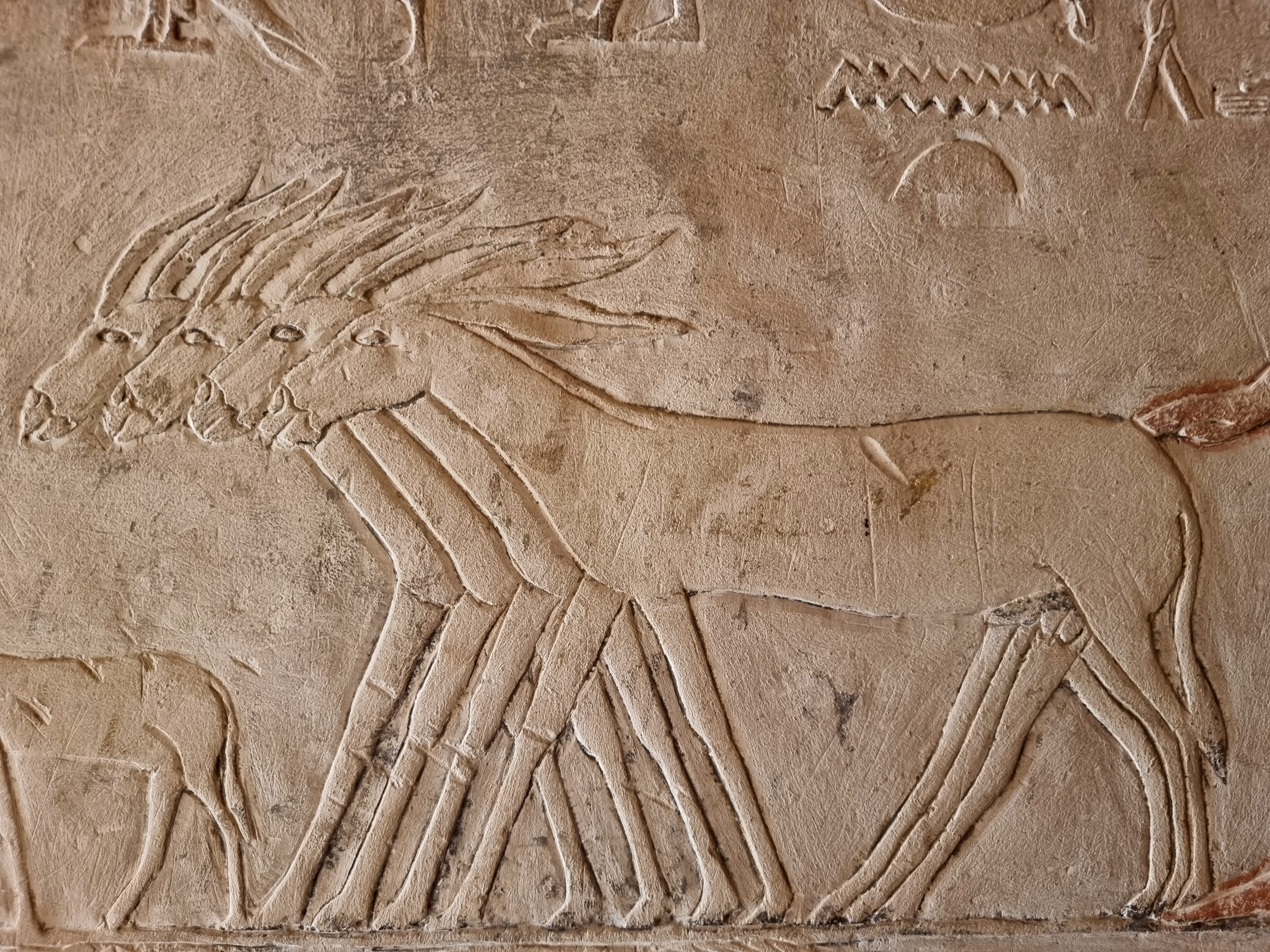

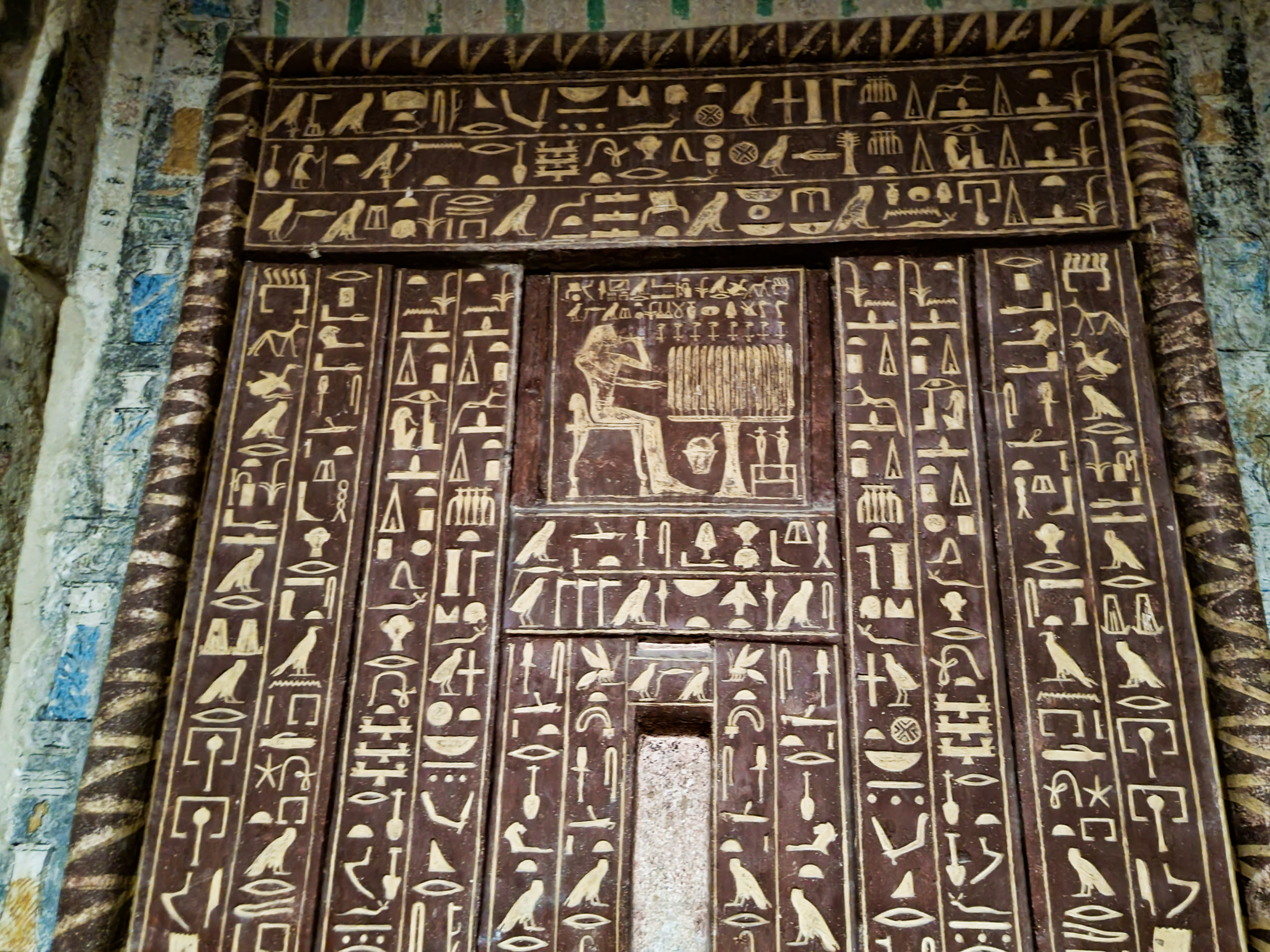

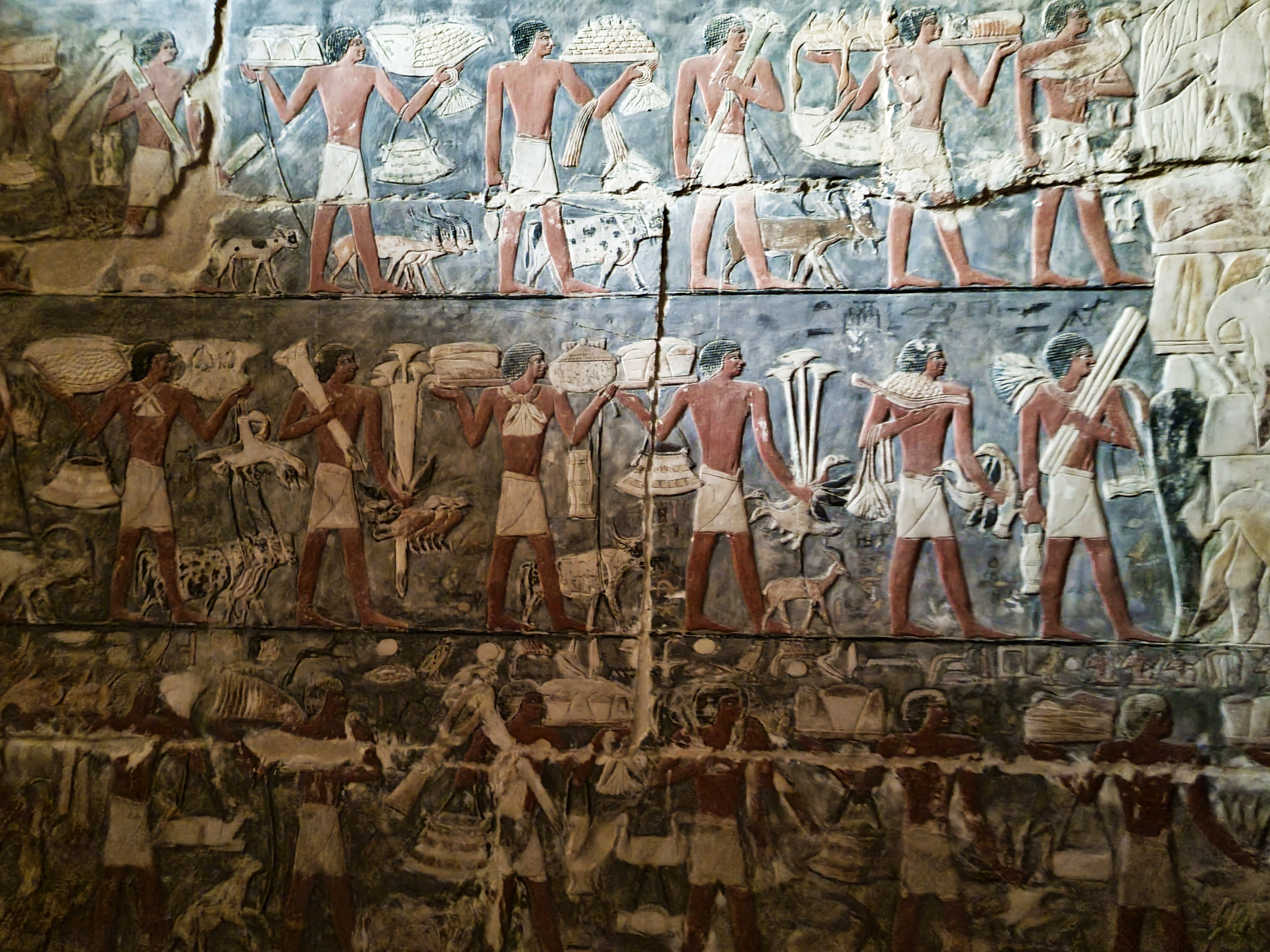

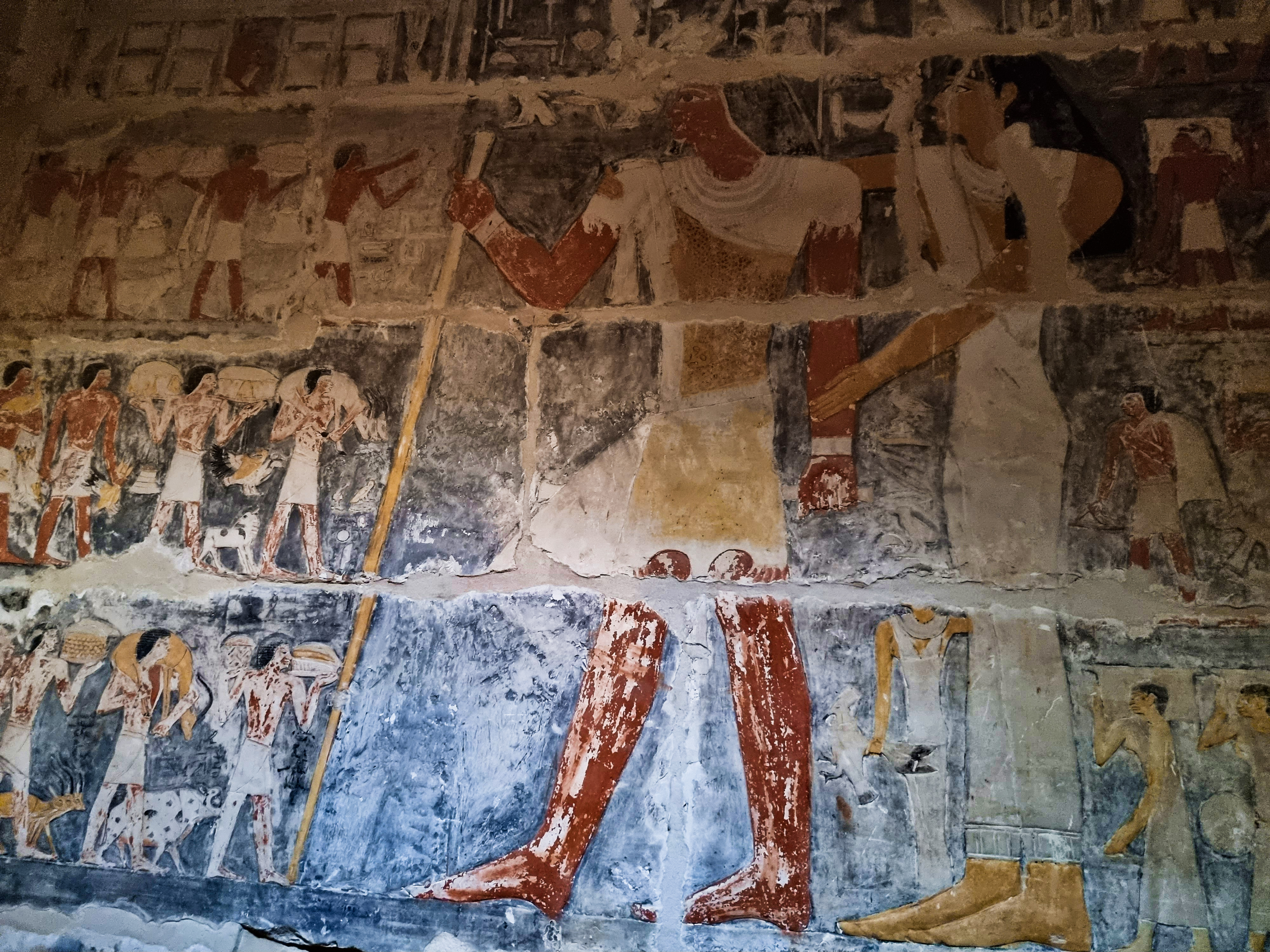
