= Wadjitefni =

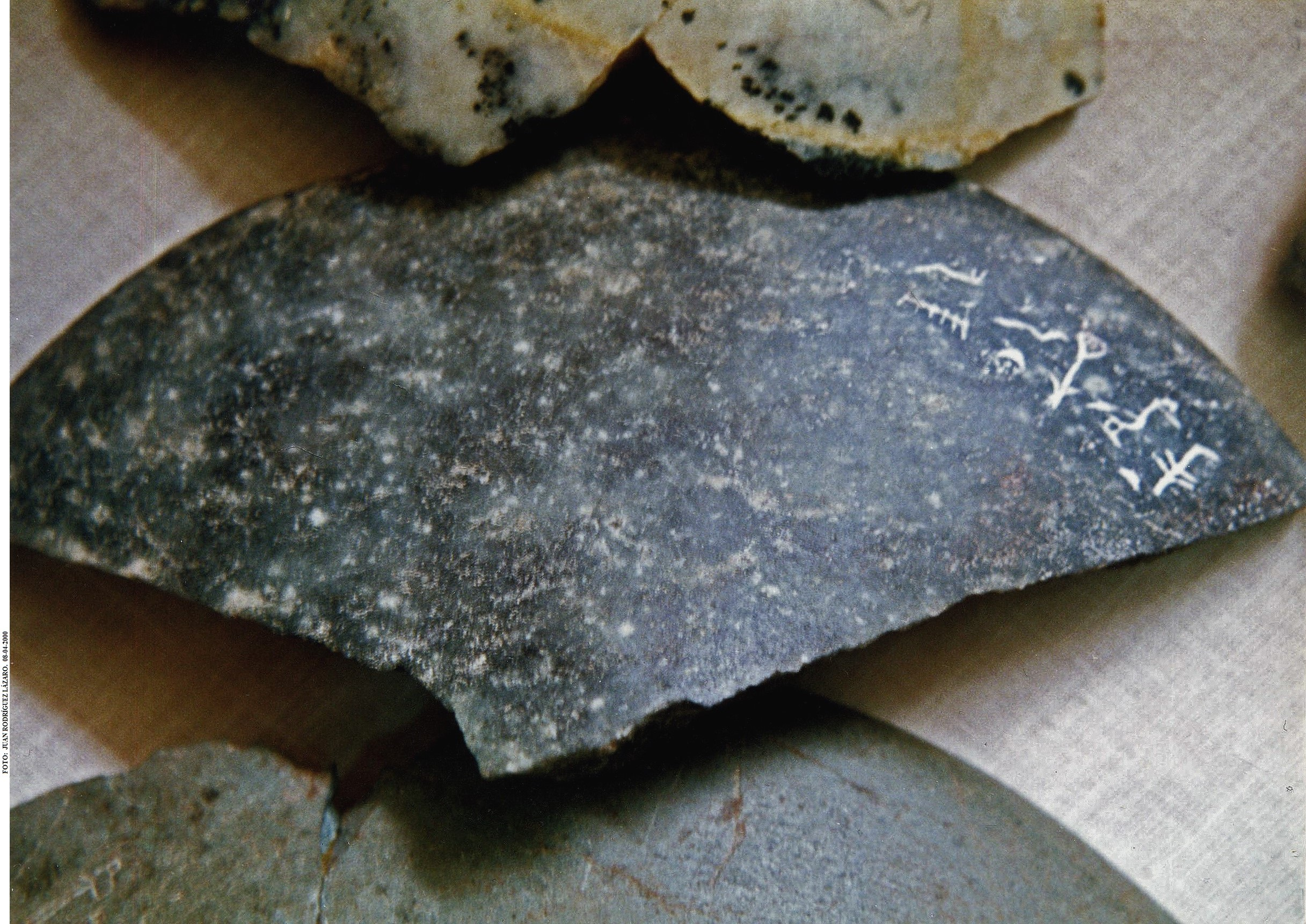
- Stone bowl fragment with name and titles of Wadjitefni.
Egyptian name
M13 I10 t f nWadji-tefni
wˀḏ-tfnj
Refreshed by his father

Wadjitefni (also read as Wadjet-tefni) was an ancient Egyptian high official and prince living during the early 2nd Dynasty. It is disputed as to who was the king (pharaoh) that reigned during Wadjitefni's time of officeship.

== Identity ==
Wadjitefni is attested by two stone bowl inscriptions only. These were found in the underground storages beneath the Southern Gallery within the Pyramid of Djoser at Saqqara. He bore the title Son of the king (Egyptian: Sa-nesw).

=== Career ===
Next to nothing is known about Wadjitefni's career, except for his title as a prince. It is also unknown, whose son he was, since no royal name was found. Calligraphic design and diction of the inscriptions show great resemblance to other inscriptions dating back to the time of the kings Nynetjer and Weneg-Nebty. Thus, Wadjitefni may have lived and served under these two kings.
