= Nubnefer =

Ancient Egyptian pharaoh

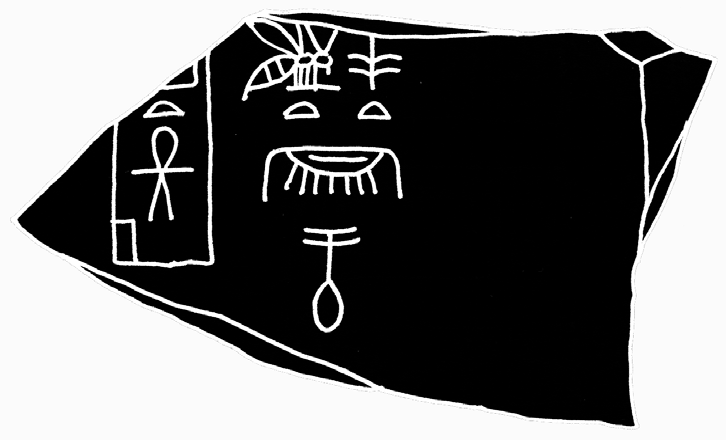
- Fragment of black schist presenting Nubnefer's name beside the building "Menti Ankh" (left)

Pharaoh
- Reign: Unknown, Early Dynastic Period
- Predecessor: Uncertain, Nynetjer (Helck and Wilkinson) Wadjenes (Kaplony)
- Successor: Uncertain, Senedj (Kaplony)
Royal titulary
Prenomen
Nisut-Bity Nubnefer
nsw.t-btj nwb-nfr
M23 t L2 t S12 F35
- Dynasty: Second Dynasty

Nubnefer is the birth name of a king (pharaoh) who may have ruled during the 2nd Dynasty of Ancient Egypt. The exact length of his reign is unknown and his chronological position is unclear.

== Name sources ==
The name "Nubnefer" appears on two black stone vessel fragments found in the Southern Galleries in the necropolis of king Djoser (3rd Dynasty) at Sakkara, mentioning a building called "Menti-Ankh" ("Life may endure"), which was founded during the reign of king Nynetjer. Therefore, Egyptologists such as Peter Kaplony, Jochem Kahl and Francesco Tiradritti believe that Nubnefer's reign should be chronologically set close to that of Nynetjer. Nubnefer's name does not appear in any further contemporary or posthumous document.

== Identity ==
Egyptologists such as Battiscombe Gunn and Iorwerth Eiddon Stephen Edwards believe that the name "Nubnefer" could be the birth name of king Nebra. In contrast, egyptologists such as Wolfgang Helck and Toby Wilkinson think that Nubnefer was the immediate successor of Nynetjer. Peter Kaplony identifies Nubnefer as a king who have ruled between the kings Wadjenes and Senedj.

== Later coinage of Nectanebo II ==
Nectanebo II, the last pharaoh of the Thirtieth Dynasty and the last native Egyptian ruler of ancient Egypt, issued a rare gold stater that was known as the Nub Nefr (Egyptian: nbw nfr, "fine gold"), which is considered the first native Egyptian coin bearing a hieroglyphic legend. The obverse of the stater shows a horse leaping right; the reverse carries the hieroglyphic inscription meaning "fine gold" using the same hieroglyphs as in the name of pharaoh Nubnefer. The coin was struck to the Macedonian weight standard (8.36 g).

A hoard of at least 38 specimens was discovered near Mit Rahina in 1919–1920, studied by Chanissat (1923). The British Museum acquired one specimen in 1926. Approximately 48 examples are documented across two die pairs, with three held at the Egyptian Museum, Cairo. In April 2023, a specimen sold at Spink for £180,000, setting a record for the highest price achieved by an ancient Egyptian coin at auction.
