= Weneg (pharaoh) =

Ancient Egyptian ruler

- Weneg-Nebty, Uneg
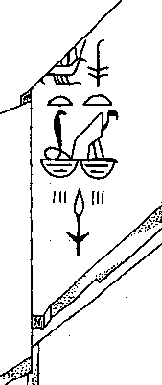
- Alabaster fragment with the throne name Nisut-bitj-Nebty-Weneg.

Pharaoh
- Reign: length of reign unknown
- Predecessor: Nynetjer
- Successor: unknown
Royal titulary
Prenomen
Nisut-Bitj-Nebty-Weneg
Nsw.t-btj-nb.tj-wng
King of Lower- and Upper Egypt,
He of the two Ladies, Weneg
M23 X1 L2 X1 G16
- Dynasty: 2nd Dynasty; around 2740 B.C.

Weneg (or Uneg), also known as Weneg-Nebty, is the throne name of an early Egyptian king, who ruled during the Second Dynasty. Although his chronological position is clear to Egyptologists, it is unclear for how long King Weneg ruled. It is also unclear as to which of the archaeologically identified Horus-kings corresponds to Weneg.

== Name sources and contradictions ==
The name "Weneg" is generally accepted to be a nebti- or throne name, introduced by the crest of the Two Ladies (the goddesses Nekhbet and Wadjet) and the sedge-and-bee-crest. Weneg's name appears in black ink inscriptions on alabaster fragments and in inscriptions on schist-vessels. Seventeen vessels bearing his name have been preserved; eleven of them were found in the underground galleries beneath the step pyramid of king Djoser at Sakkara. Egyptologists such as Wolfgang Helck and Francesco Tiradritti point out that all the inscriptions are made in the place of existing inscriptions, which means that the names that were originally placed on the vessels were completely different.

The symbol that was used to write Weneg's name is the object of significant dispute between Egyptologists to this day. The so-called "weneg flower" is rarely used in Egyptian writing. Mysteriously, the weneg flower is often guided by six vertical "strokes", three of them on each side of the flower bud. The meaning of these strokes is unknown. After Weneg's death, his heraldic flower was not used again until king Teti (6th dynasty), when it was used in his Pyramid Texts to name a “Weneg” as a sky and death deity which was addressed with "Son of Ra" and "follower of the deceased king". So it seems that the weneg flower was somehow connected with the Egyptian sun and death cult. But the true meaning of the flower as a king's name remains unknown.

== Identification ==
Since Weneg's name first became known to Egyptologists, scholars have been trying to match the nebti name of Weneg to contemporary Horus-kings. The following sections discuss some of the theories.

=== Weneg corresponds to Hor-Nebra (or Raneb) ===
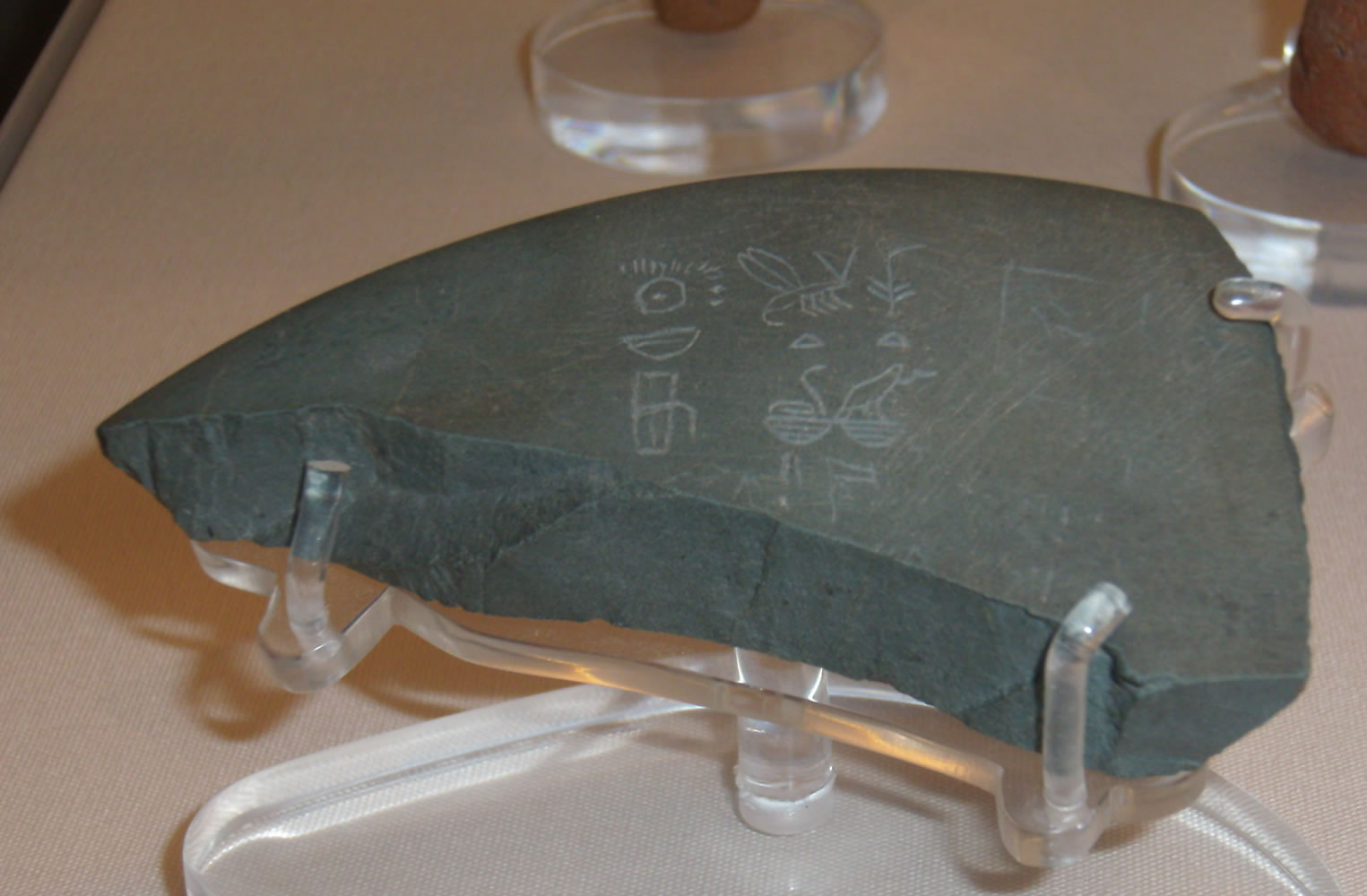
BM EA 35556, the stone vessel used by Jochem Kahl to equate Weneg with Nebra.

Egyptologist Jochem Kahl argues that Weneg was the same person as king Nebra, the second ruler of the 2nd dynasty. He points to a vessel fragment made from an igneous material, which was found in the tomb of king Peribsen (a later ruler of the 2nd dynasty) at Abydos. He believed he had found on the pot shard weak, but clear, traces of the weneg flower beneath the inscribed name of king Ninetjer. On the right side of Ninetjer's name the depiction of the Ka house of king Nebrais partially preserved. The complete arrangement led Kahl to the conclusion that the weneg flower and Nebra's name were connected to each other and king Ninetjer later replaced the inscription. Kahl also points out that king Ninetjer wrote his name mirrored, so that his name points in the opposite direction to Nebra's name. Kahl's theory is the subject of continuing debate since the vessel inscription is badly damaged and thus leaves plenty of room for varying interpretations.

=== Weneg corresponds to Hor-Sekhemib-Perenmaat ===
Egyptologists such as Nicolas Grimal, Wolfgang Helck and Walter Bryan Emery identify Weneg with king Sekhemib-Perenmaat and with the Ramesside royal cartouche-name Wadjenes. Their theory is based on the assumption that Sekhemib and Seth-Peribsen were different rulers and that both were the immediate successors of king Ninetjer. But this theory is not commonly accepted, because clay seals of Sekhemib were found in the tomb of king Peribsen, the second to last ruler of the 2nd dynasty. The clay seals set Sekhemib's reign close to Peribsen's, whilst the Ramesside name "Wadjenes" is placed near the beginning of the 2nd dynasty.

=== Weneg as an independent ruler ===
Egyptologists such as Peter Kaplony and Richard Weill argue that Weneg was a separate king from other kings of the period. They suggest that Weneg succeeded Ninetjer but preceded Sekhemib and or Peribsen and that Weneg's name is preserved in Ramesside kinglists under the name "Wadjenes". Their assumption is firstly based on the widely accepted theory that Ramesside scribes interchanged the weneg flower with the papyrus haulm, changing it into the name "Wadjenes". Secondly, Kaplony and Weill's theory is based on the inscription on the Cairo stone. They believe that the name "Wenegsekhemwy" is preserved over the third line of year events. This theory is also not widely accepted, as the Cairo stone is badly damaged and the very weak traces of the hieroglyphs leave too much room for different interpretations.

== Reign ==
Little is known about Weneg's reign. The vessel inscriptions mentioning his name only show reports about ceremonial events, such as the "raising up of the pillars of Horus". This feast is frequently reported on vessels from Nynetjer's reign, which brings Weneg's chronological position very close to that of Nynetjer.

The length of Weneg's rulership is unknown. If he was the same person as king Wadjenes, he ruled (according to the Royal Canon of Turin) for 54 years. If Weneg was the same person as king "Tlas", mentioned by the historian Manetho, he ruled for 17 years. But modern Egyptologists have doubts about both statements and evaluate them as misinterpretations or exaggerations. If Weneg was actually a separate ruler, as Richard Weill and Peter Kaplony believe, he may have ruled for 12 years, depending on their reconstructions of the Cairo stone inscriptions.

One theory suggests that the once unified kingdom of Egypt was divided after Nynetjer's death into two parts. Consequently, for a period after king Weneg's death, two kings ruled at the same time over Egypt suggesting that Weneg was an independent ruler. This assumption is based on the observation that both the Thinite and Memphite king lists of the Ramesside era mention the names "Wadjenes" and "Senedj" as the immediate successors of king Nynetjer. The Abydos king lists, for example, mention only six kings for the 2nd dynasty, whilst all the other kinglists mention nine kings. So Weneg may have been the last king who had ruled over the whole of Egypt, before sharing his throne (and control over Egypt) with another king. It remains unclear who the other king may have been. Weneg's successor may have been Senedj but even that is uncertain in this shadowy period of the 2nd dynasty of Egypt.

Preceded by Horus Sa	Pharaoh of Egypt	Succeeded by Wadjenes
