= Wadjenes =

Ancient Egyptian ruler

- Wadjlas, Ougotlas, Outlas, Tlas
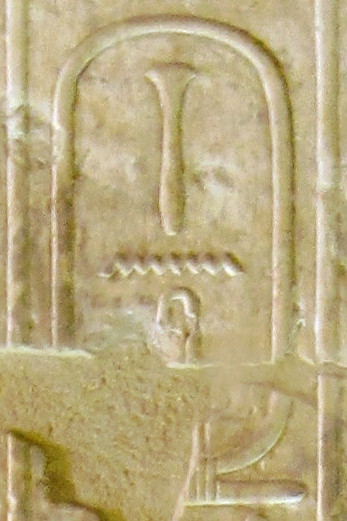
- Cartouche name of Wadjenes in the Abydos King List (cartouche no. 12)

Pharaoh
- Reign: length of reign unknown (17 years?) c. 2800 BC - c. 2780 BC
- Predecessor: Nynetjer
- Successor: Senedj
Royal titulary
Prenomen
Abydos King List
Wadjenes
W3dj-ns
Fresh of the tongue
< M13 N35 S29 >
Saqqara King List
Wadjlas
W3dj-l3s
Fresh of the tongue
< M13 F20 Z1 F51 >
Turin Canon
...s
< hatching S29 > G7
- Died: c. 2780 BC (aged 70)
- Dynasty: 2nd Dynasty; around 2740 B.C.

Wadjenes (ancient Egyptian Wadj-nes, which means "fresh of tongue"), also known as Wadjlas, Ougotlas and Tlas, was an early Egyptian king who may have ruled during the 2nd Dynasty. Since the name form "Wadjenes" is not contemporarily attested as the name of a king, but frequently appears in Ramesside kinglists, Egyptologists to this day are trying to connect Wadjenes with contemporary Horus-kings.

== Name sources ==
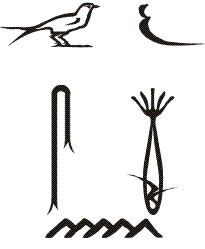
Black ink inscription on alabaster showing a "wer-ma'a Wadjesen"

The king's name "Wadjenes" is attested only in the Ramesside kinglists, where he is always presented as the immediate successor of king Nynetjer and as the predecessor of king Senedj. The same goes for the Royal Canon of Turin, where the entry for his name is damaged so only the years of rulership are preserved.

Whilst all kinglists match each other regarding the chronological position of Wadjenes, Egyptologists are uncertain as to the origin of the name "Wadjenes". Egyptologists and historians such as Winfried Barta, Bernhard Grdseloff and Iorwerth Eiddon Stephen Edwards believe that the papyrus haulm, the first symbol in Wadjenes's name, is a misinterpretation of the hieroglyphic sign of a flower called Weneg (also read as Uneg), which is rarely used in Egyptian writing. A king Weneg (also written as "Weneg-Nebti") is also contemporarily identified by black ink-inscriptions on alabaster-shards and as incised writings on schist vessels originating from the underground galleries beneath the step pyramid of king Djoser at Sakkara. It is possible that Ramesside scribes interchanged the Weneg flower with the papyrus haulm, since both signs are very similar to each other in hieratic script.

Besides the artefacts with the name "Weneg-Nebti", further objects made of alabaster show the personal name "Wadj-sen" in connection with the Sed festival. Egyptologists such as Wolfgang Helck think that Wadj-sen was a crown prince, since the titulary Wer-ma'a ("he who sees the greatest") was always reserved for the eldest son of a king and so it is also connected with Wadj-sen's name. However, Egyptologists such as Peter Kaplony and Jürgen von Beckerath believe that Weneg-Nebti and Wadjenes are identical and that Wadjenes's Horus name was Sekhemib-Perenmaat or Horus Sa.

The ancient Egyptian historian Manetho called Wadjenes "Tlas". This name distortion may be based on the Coptic rewriting of the name "Wadjenes" as "Ougotlas", meaning ″fresh of tongue″.

== Reign ==
Very little is known about Wadjenes's reign. The Turin King List lists Wadjenes as living for 70 years, whilst Manetho assigns 17 years to him. Combined, they imply Wadjenes got his throne at age 53. Egyptologists evaluate both lists as misinterpretations by Ramesside scribes or as an exaggeration. If Wadjenes was an independent ruler (as Richard Weill and Peter Kaplony believe) he was evidently the last to rule over a unified realm, since his name is found in both Memphite and Thinite royal chronicles. It is largely accepted by Egyptologists that the immediate successor of king Nynetjer left a divided Egypt, which was headed by two kings who ruled at the same time. The theory is based on the unusual serekh name of a king called Peribsen, who succeeded Nynetjer and who placed the crest animal of Seth above his name. Since the deity Seth was of Ombite origin, king Peribsen was probably of Ombite origin, too, and he definitely ruled only in Upper Egypt. His name is missing from the Ramesside Memphite kinglists, because they were all written by Memphite priests and they did not accept any non-Memphite ruler as a rightful ancestor.

Preceded by Weneg (pharaoh)	Pharaoh of Egypt	Succeeded by Senedj
