= Pehen-Ptah =

Egyptian high official, sculptor and maker of vases

- Master of the sculptors
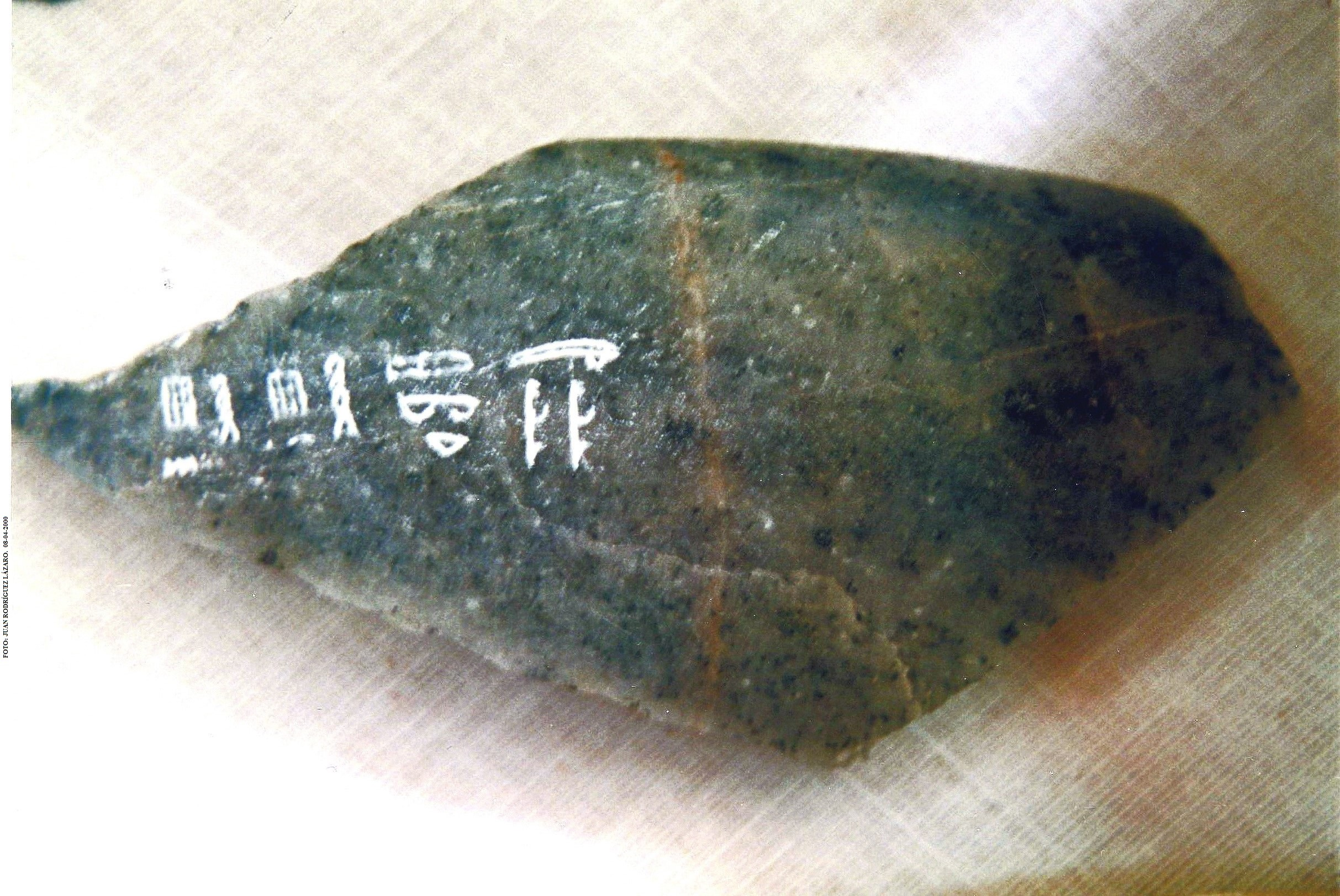
- Stone bowl fragment with name and titles of Pehen-Ptah.
Egyptian name
p t V28 p n V28 pḥn-ptḥ
Dedicated to Ptah

Pehen-Ptah (also read Ptah-Pehen and Ptahpehen) was an ancient Egyptian high official, sculptor and maker of vases during the 2nd Dynasty or early 3rd Dynasty. It is not known for certain which king did Pehen-Ptah serve.

== Identity ==
Pehen-Ptah is attested by four stone bowl inscriptions only. These were found in the underground storages beneath the Southern Gallery within king Djoser's pyramid necropolis at Saqqara. His name is of some interest to Egyptologists, because it is linked to the god Ptah.

=== Titles ===
As a high ranking official and priest, Pehen-Ptah bore several elite and pious titularies:

- God servant of Ptah (Egyptian: hem-netjer ptah).
- Master of the sculptors (Egyptian: Medjehw-qesenw).
- Creator of the (royal) vases (Egyptian: Afet-nebwj).
- Headband of the gods (Egyptian: Shefed-netjerw).

=== Career ===
Next to nothing is known about Pehen-Ptah's career, except for his titles. It is also unknown under which pharaoh he might have served. Since he is mentioned as the "headband of the gods" during a Hebsed, his ruler may have ruled very long, because the Hebsed ("feast of Sed") was commonly celebrated in the 30th year after coronation. There are only two kings from 2nd and 3rd dynasty to have ruled that long: Nynetjer and (possibly) Djoser. It cannot be excluded, however, that Pehen-Ptah served a king who celebrated a Hebsed in advance as is now known to have happened in a few cases, for uncertain reasons. Thus, the problem of determining the exact time period corresponding to Pehen-Ptah's lifetime remains open.
