= Senedj =

Egyptian pharaoh

- Sened, Sendj, Sethenes
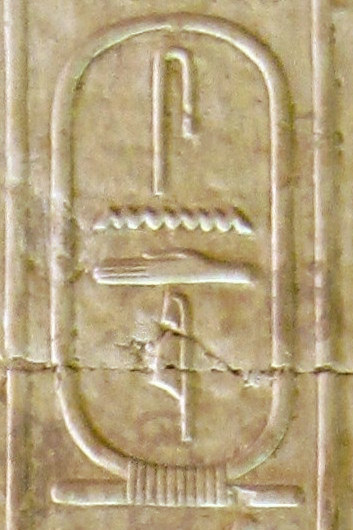
- Cartouche name of Senedj in the Abydos King List (cartouche no. 13)

Pharaoh
- Reign: c. 2780 BC? - c. 2740 BC??
- Predecessor: Wadjenes or Weneg
- Successor: uncertain; Sekhemib, Peribsen, Neferkara I
Royal titulary
Prenomen
Stone bowl from Giza
King of Upper- and Lower Egypt, Sened
nsw.t-btj snd
M23 X1 L2 X1 s n d
Tomb of Shery (4th dynasty), Saqqara
Sened
Snd
The frightful one
< s n d >
Abydos King List
Senedj
Snd.j
The frightful one
< s n d i >
Saqqara King List
Senedj
Snd.j
The frightful one
< G54 >
Turin Canon
Senedj
Snd.j
The frightful one
< G54 HASH > HASH
- Father: Wadjenes ?
- Dynasty: 2nd Dynasty

Senedj (also known as Sened and Sethenes) was an early Egyptian king (pharaoh), who may have ruled during the 2nd Dynasty. His historical standing remains uncertain. His name is included in the kinglists of the Ramesside era, although it is written in different ways: While the Abydos King List imitates the archaic form, the Royal Canon of Turin and the Saqqara King List form the name with the hieroglyphic sign of a plucked goose.

It is unknown how long Senedj ruled over Egypt. The Royal Canon of Turin credits him with a lifespan of 54 years, the ancient Egyptian historian Manetho states that Séthenes (as he calls Senedj) ruled for 41 years.

== Name sources ==
The possibly only known contemporary inscription from Senedj's reign was found in 1909 by Egyptologist Uvo Hölscher, who assisted the excavations at the Khephren- and Menkaura temple at Giza. Hölscher found a small, thin-walled and polished diorite shard, which once belonged to a flat bowl. At the left breakline an incised inscription gives the reading: "The king of Upper- and Lower Egypt, Senedj". The inscription goes from the right to the left and exceeds the breakline, but the king's name remains reconstructable. The precious artifact was published in 1912. It was also examined by George Andrew Reisner, who mentioned it shortly in his book Mycerinus, the Temples of the Third Pyramid at Giza.

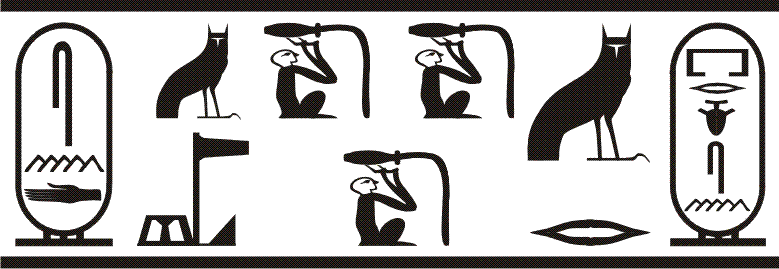
Inscription on a false door from the tomb of the high priest Shery at Saqqara, mentioning Senedj.

The next source referring to king Senedj dates back to the beginning or middle of the 4th Dynasty. The name, written in a cartouche, appears in the inscription on a false door belonging to the mastaba tomb of the high priest Shery at Saqqara. Shery held the title “overseer of all wab-priests of king Peribsen in the necropolis of king Senedj”, “overseer of the ka-priests of king Senedj” and “god's servant of Senedj”. Senedj's name is written in archaic form and set in a cartouche, which is an anachronism, since the cartouche itself was not used until the end of 3rd Dynasty under king Huni. Egyptologist Dietrich Wildung points to two further priests and possible relatives of Shery, who both also participated the funerary cult of Senedj, Inkef and Siy.

Senedj is also mentioned in Papyrus Berlin 3038, which contains medical prescriptions and therapies for numerous diseases. One of these gives instructions for treating foot cramps, and closes with the claim that the recipe for the ointment originates from a "book of vessels". This book is claimed to originate from the time of king Usáphais (identical with king Horus Den of Dynasty I). King Senedj allegedly received the book as an inheritance gift.

The latest mention of Senedj's name appears on a small bronze statuette in the shape of a kneeling king wearing the White Crown of Upper Egypt and holding incense burners in its hands. Additionally, the figurine wears a belt which has Senedj's name carved at the back.

Egyptologist Peter Munro has written a report about the existence of a mud seal inscription showing the cartouche name Nefer-senedj-Ra, which he thinks to be a version of “Senedj”. But since the finding was never photographed nor drawn and the alleged object meanwhile got lost, Munro's claim is highly questioned by many scholars.

== Identity ==
The horus name of Senedj remains unknown. The false door inscription of Shery might indicate that Senedj is identical with king Seth-Peribsen and that the name "Senedj" was brought into the kinglists, because a seth-name was not allowed to be mentioned. It may have been done by taking the name "Peribsen" (He who comes forth by their will), removing the syllables for "per" and "ib", and adding the "edj" syllable in the end to get "Senedj" (The frightful one).

Other Egyptologists, such as Wolfgang Helck and Dietrich Wildung, are not so sure and believe that Senedj and Peribsen were different rulers. They point out that the false door inscription has the names of both strictly separated from each other. Additionally, Wildung thinks that Senedj donated an offering chapel to Peribsen in his necropolis. This theory in turn is questioned by Helck and Hermann A. Schlögl, who point to the clay seals of king Sekhemib found in the entrance area of Peribsen's tomb, which might prove that Sekhemib buried Peribsen, not Senedj.

== Reign ==
=== Splitting kingdoms ===
Egyptologists such as Wolfgang Helck, Nicolas Grimal, Hermann Alexander Schlögl and Francesco Tiradritti believe that king Nynetjer, the third ruler of 2nd dynasty, left a realm that was suffering from an overly complex state administration and that Nynetjer decided to split Egypt to leave it to his two sons (or, at least, two chosen successors) who would rule two separate kingdoms, in the hope that the two rulers could better administer the states. In contrast, Egyptologists such as Barbara Bell believe that an economic catastrophe such as a famine or a long lasting drought affected Egypt. Therefore, to better address the problem of feeding the Egyptian population, Nynetjer split the realm into two and his successors founded two independent realms until the famine came to an end. Bell points to the inscriptions of the Palermo stone, where, in her opinion, the records of the annual Nile floods show constantly low levels during this period.

Bell's theory is refuted today by Egyptologists such as Stephan Seidlmayer, who corrected Bell's calculations. Seidlmayer has shown that the annual Nile floods were at usual levels at Nynetjer's time up to the period of the Old Kingdom. Bell had overlooked that the heights of the Nile floods in the Palermo stone inscription only takes into account the measurements of the nilometers around Memphis, but not elsewhere along the river. Any long-lasting drought can therefore be excluded.

=== Coregency and succession ===
It is unclear if Senedj already shared his throne with another ruler, or if the Egyptian state was split at the time of his death. All known kinglists such as the Sakkara list, the Turin King List and the Abydos table list a king Wadjenes as predecessor of Senedj. After Senedj, the kinglists differ from each other in respect of the successors. While the Sakkara list and the Turin canon mention the kings Neferka(ra), Neferkasokar and Hudjefa I as immediate successors, the Abydos list skips them and lists a king Djadjay (identical with king Khasekhemwy). If Egypt was already divided when Senedj gained the throne, kings like Sekhemib and Peribsen would have ruled Upper Egypt, whilst Senedj and his successors, Neferka(ra) and Hudjefa I, would have ruled Lower Egypt. The division of Egypt was brought to an end by king Khasekhemwy.

== Tomb ==
It is unknown where Senedj was buried. If he was actually the same person as Peribsen, he was buried in tomb P at Abydos.

Other Egyptologists, such as Toby Wilkinson assumed that Senedj might have been buried at Saqqara. To support this view, Wilkinson makes the observation that mortuary priests in earlier times were never buried too far away from the king for whom they had practised the mortuary cult. Wilkinson thinks that one of the Great Southern Galleries within the Necropolis of King Djoser (3rd Dynasty) was originally Senedj's tomb.

| Preceded by Wadjenes | Pharaoh of Egypt | Succeeded by Seth-Peribsen |
