= Nebra (pharaoh) =

Horus name of the second early Egyptian king of the 2nd dynasty

- Raneb, Nebre, Kakau, Kaichoos, Cechous
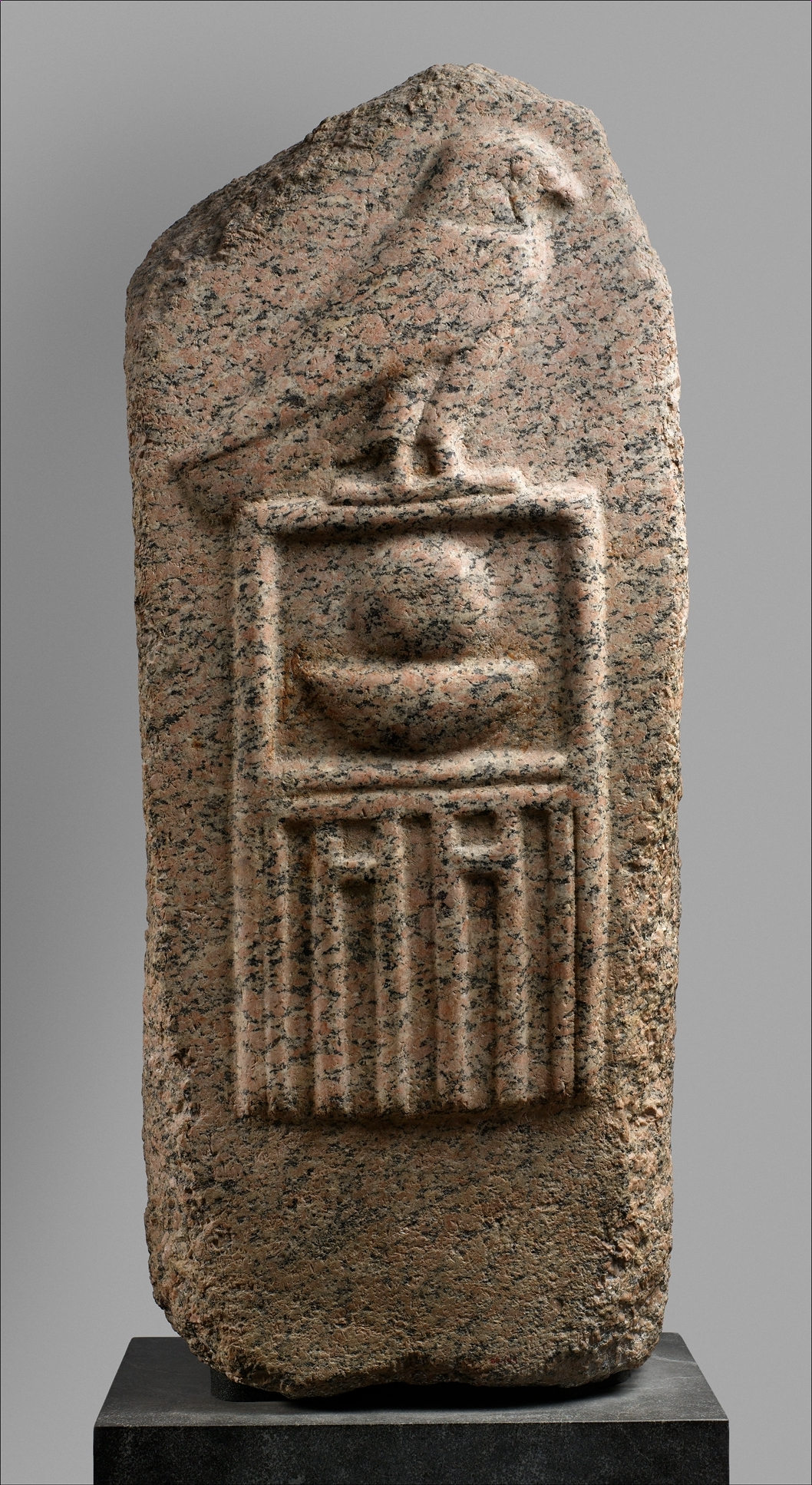
- Tomb stela of Nebra, Metropolitan Museum of Art, New York

Pharaoh
- Reign: 10–14 years; c. 29th century BC
- Predecessor: Hotepsekhemwy
- Successor: Nynetjer
Royal titulary
Horus name
Hor-Nebra
Hr-nb-rˁ
Lord of the sun of Horus
G5	N5 V30
Nebty name
Nebra-Nebty
S.htp-nbt.j
Lord of the sun of the Two Ladies
G16 N5 V30
Prenomen
Nisut-bitj-Nebty-Nebra
Nsw.t-btj-rˁ-nb
King of Upper- and Lower Egypt,
he of the Two Ladies, Nebra
M23 X1 L2 X1 G16 N5 V30
Abydos King List
Kakau
Bull of Apis
K3-k3.w
< D28 D52 D52 D52 >
Saqqara King List
Kakau
Bull of Apis
K3-k3.w
< D28 D52 D52 D52 >
Turin Canon
...Kakau
...bull of Apis
...k3-k3.w
< HASH HASH D52 E1 G43 > G7
- Children: Perneb, Nynetjer ?
- Father: Hotepsekhemwy ?
- Burial: Gallery Tomb A, Saqqara (?)
- Dynasty: 2nd Dynasty; around 2850 BC

Nebra or Raneb is the Horus name of the second early Egyptian king of the 2nd Dynasty. The exact length of his reign is unknown since the Turin canon is damaged and the year accounts are lost. Manetho suggests that Nebra's reign lasted 39 years, but Egyptologists question Manetho's view as a misinterpretation or exaggeration of information that was available to him. They credit Nebra with either a 10- or 14-year rule.

== Attestations ==
Nebra's name appears on several stone vessels, mostly made of schist, alabaster and marble. Most of the bowls were found at Abydos, Giza and Saqqara. The inscriptions contain depictions of cultic buildings such as the Ka-house, depictions of deities such as Bastet, Neith and Seth and also the mentionings of cultic feasts. All found objects present Nebra's name either together with that of his predecessor Hotepsekhemwy or with his successor Nynetjer. Nebra's name never appears alone.

Clay seal impressions with Nebra's name were found beneath the causeway of the Pyramid of Unas at Saqqara and inside a large gallery tomb, also at Saqqara. This tomb also yielded several seal impressions with Hotepsekhemwy's name and for this reason it is debated whether the tomb belongs to Nebra or his predecessor Hotepsekhemwy.

In 2012, Pierre Tallet and Damien Leisnay reported three rock inscriptions with Nebra's horus name found in the south of the Sinai Peninsula. Each rock inscription can be found in a different wadi: Wadi Abu Madawi, Wadi Abu Koua and Wadi Ameyra. The places where Nebra's name is displayed lie along a very old route used for expeditions from the western shore of the Sinai to its inland, where copper and turquoise mines existed. Along the wadis the names of predynastic kings up to pharaohs of the 4th Dynasty are located at the same places.

== Interpretation of sun element in name ==
Nebra's serekh name is of great interest to Egyptologists, since it is written with the hieroglyphic sign of the Sun, which had not yet become the object of divine adoration during his lifetime. At the time of king Nebra, the most important religious cults were concentrated on the preservation of the dualistic equal status of the state patrons Horus and Seth. Nothing was more important than keeping that divine balance. The kings themselves were seen as the living representation of that godlike pair. The Sun was seen as a celestial object controlled either by Horus or, as in the case of king Seth-Peribsen, by Seth. Therefore, the Sun was not an independent deity yet. The first definite proof of the existence of the Sun-deity Ra occurs at the beginning of the 3rd dynasty during the reign of king Djoser in the names of high officials such as Hesyre. And the first definitive detectable proof for a fully established royal Sun cult occurs under king Radjedef, the third ruler of the 4th Dynasty. He was the first king who connected his birth name with the name of Ra, starting the great religious belief that Egyptian kings were the living representation of the Sun alongside Horus and Seth.

Therefore, Nebra's Horus name is problematic regarding its translation and meaning. The typical translation of Nebra's name as "Ra is my lord", which would be read "Raneb", is questionable, as this would assume that the Sun was already being worshiped as an independent deity. Consequently, Egyptologists have proposed the translation "Lord of the sun (of Horus)" which is read "Nebra" and implies the pharaoh's rule over the Sun (as a celestial body), which was indeed also under Horus' or Seth's control. Any solar religion or solar symbolism were not yet established in any useful form and it is now thought that king Nebra might actually have been the first king who adopted extended religious thought about the Sun and the sky.

== Family ==
The wife of Nebra is unknown. A “son of the king” and “priest of Sopdu” named Perneb might have been his son, but since the clay seals providing his name and titles were found in a gallery tomb which is attributed to two kings equally (Nebra and his predecessor, Hotepsekhemwy), it is unclear whose son Perneb really was.

== Identity ==
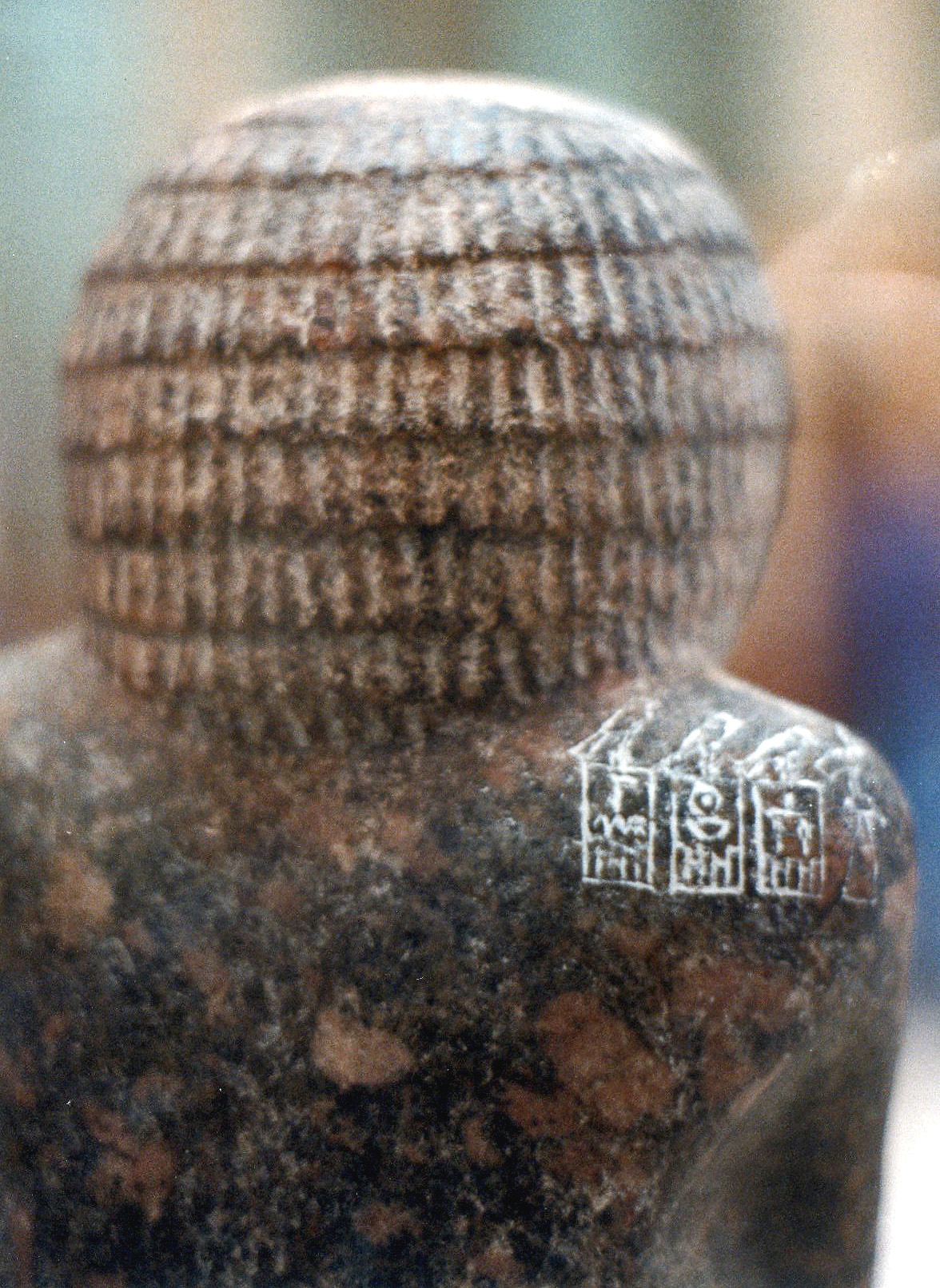
Statue of Hotepdief, priest of the mortuary cults of the first 3 rulers of the dynasty, Hotepsekhemwy, Nebra and Nynetjer. The serekh of Nebra is the middle one on the shoulder of the priest.

King Nebra is commonly identified with the Ramesside-era cartouche-name Kakau, which can be translated as "The bull of Apis". This links to the anecdote written by Manetho, who said that under king Kêchoós (the Greek version of the name Kakau) the deities Apies, the goat of Mendes and Menevus were "introduced and worshipped as gods". This view is questioned by modern Egyptologists, as there was already a cult of Apis established during the 1st Dynasty, if not earlier. The name "Kakau" itself is problematic for this early pharaoh, as there was no name source from Nebra's time that could have been used to form the word.

The birth name of Nebra also remains unclear. A theory by Egyptologist Jochem Kahl says that Nebra was the same person as the mysterious king Weneg-Nebti. He points to a vessel fragment made of volcanic ash, which was found in the tomb of king Peribsen (a later ruler during the 2nd dynasty) at Abydos. On the pot sherd he believes there are traces of the weneg-flower beneath the incised name of king Ninetjer. To the right of Ninetjer's name the depiction of the Ka-house of king Nebra is partially preserved. This arrangement led Kahl to conclude that the weneg-flower and Nebra's name were connected to each other and king Ninetjer replaced the inscription. Kahl also points out that king Ninetjer wrote his name mirrored, so that his name deliberately runs in the opposite direction to Nebra's name. Kahl's theory is the subject of continuing discussion since the vessel inscription is damaged, thus leaving plenty of room for varying interpretations.

Egyptologists such as Jürgen von Beckerath and Battiscombe Gunn identify Nebra with another mysterious early pharaoh: Nubnefer. This link is questioned by other scholars, since the rulers of 2nd Dynasty often wrote their birth and Horus names in the same way (for example: Hor-Nebra → Nisut-Bity-Nebty-Nebra). Thus the name "Nubnefer" may be the birth name of a different king.

== Reign ==
Little is known about Nebra's reign. The discovery of sealings bearing Nebra's name together with sealings of Hotepsekhemwy at Saqqara suggests that Nebra conducted the burial of Hotepsekhemwy and was his direct successor. Additional confirmation of this succession is provided by a statue and a stone bowl both bearing Hotepsekhemwy and Nebra's serekhs in juxtaposition. Other pot inscriptions and seal impressions surviving from his time only name cult-related and administrative events, such as the "Erecting of the pillars of Horus". Under Nebra, the first depiction of the goddess Bastet occurs. The exact duration of Nebra's reign is the subject of investigations. Reconstructions of the well known Palermo Stone, a black basalt table presenting the yearly events of the kings from the beginning of the 1st dynasty up to king Neferirkare in the shape of clearly divided charts, leads to the conclusion that Nebra and his predecessor, king Hotepsekhemwy, ruled altogether for 39 years. Since Nebra has fewer records of his rule than Hotepsekhemwy, Nebra is thought to have ruled for a shorter time. The calculations differ from 29 and 10 years to 25 and 14 years.

According to different authors, Nebra ruled Egypt c. 2850 BC, from 2820 BC to 2790 BC (Donald B. Redford), 2800 BC to 2785 BC (Jürgen von Beckerath) or 2765 BC to 2750 BC (J. Málek).

== Tomb ==
The location of Nebra's tomb is unknown. The more accepted theory is that Hotepsekhemwy and his son Nebra shared Gallery Tomb A beneath the funeral passage of the Fifth-dynasty-king- Unas-necropolis at Saqqara since some seal impressions of king Nebra have been found in these galleries. However, Egyptologists such as Wolfgang Helck and Peter Munro believe that Nebra was buried in the gallery tomb B beneath the causeway of the Pyramid of Unas at Saqqara. Indeed, most of the artifacts bearing Nebra's name were also found there.

== Gallery ==
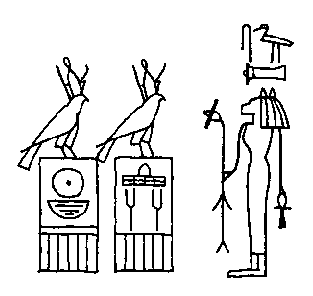
Stone bowl inscription bearing Nebra and Hotepsekhemwy serekhs before the goddess Bastet

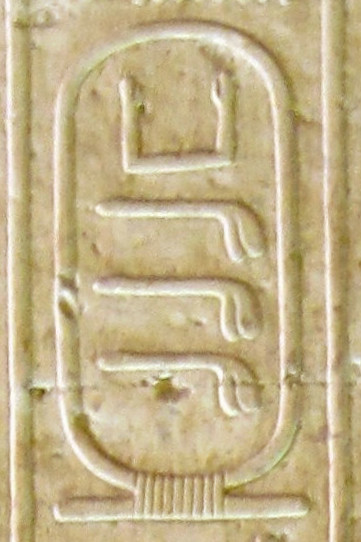
Cartouche name of Nebra in the Abydos King List, read as k3 k3w(kakau) (cartouche no. 10)

Preceded by Hotepsekhemwy	Pharaoh of Egypt	Succeeded by Nynetjer
