= Nicolas Grimal =

French Egyptologist (born 1948)

Nicolas-Christophe Grimal (born 13 November 1948 in Libourne) is a French Egyptologist.

== Biography ==
Nicolas Grimal was born to Pierre Grimal in 1948. After his Agrégation in Classics in 1971, he obtained a PhD in 1976 and a Doctorat d'État in 1984. He has been a professor at the Sorbonne from 1988 to 2000.

From 1989 to 1999, he headed the French Institute of Oriental Archeology in Cairo. Since 1990, he has been the scientific director of the Franco-Egyptian Centre for study of the temples of Karnak. He has held the chair of Egyptology at the Collège de France since 2000.

== Honours ==
- Commander of the Palmes académiques.
- Officer of the Légion d'honneur.
- Officer of the ordre national du Mérite.

== Prizes and Awards ==
- Prix Grimal le Petit, personnalité de l'année (2022).
- Prix Gaston Maspero (1987).
- Prix Diane Potier-Boes (1989).
- Member of the Académie des inscriptions et belles-lettres (2006).
- Member of the Académie des sciences d'outre-mer (2016).
- Foreign Associate of the Deutsches archäologisches Instituts, Berlin (1995).
- Member of the Institut d'Égypte (1994).
- Foreign Associate of the Akademie der Wissenschaften, Wien (2007).

== Works ==
- Histoire de l'Égypte ancienne, Fayard, Paris, 1988, ISBN 2-213-02191-0 (English: A History of Ancient Egypt, Blackwell, 1992, ISBN 0631174729)
- Leçon inaugurale, faite le mardi 10 mars 2000, Collège de France, Chaire de civilisation pharaonique, archéologie, philologie, histoire, Collège de France, Paris, 2000
- Leçon inaugurale, faite le mardi 24 octobre 2000, Collège de France, Paris, 2000.
