= Peter Kaplony =

Hungarian-Swiss Egyptologist (1933–2011)

Peter Árpád Kaplony
- Born: 15 June 1933; Budapest, Hungary
- Died: 11 February 2011 (aged 77); Zurich, Switzerland
- Occupation: Egyptologist
- Known for: Specialist of the pre-dynastic and early dynastic periods of Egypt

Peter Árpád Kaplony (15 June 1933 in Budapest – 11 February 2011 in Zurich) was a Hungarian-born Swiss egyptologist.

== Life ==
Kaplony, son of a Hungarian military officer, emigrated to Switzerland as a child in December 1944. He became a Swiss citizen in 1958. He studied Ancient History, Egyptology, Arabic language and Arabic literature in the University of Zurich and University of Basel. He participated in the excavations of the Sun temple of Userkaf in Abusir from 1954 until 1957 with a joint Swiss and German team of archeologists. In 1959, he was awarded the degree of Doctor of Philosophy in Zurich and, in 1964, his Habilitation.

From 1970 until his retirement in 2000, Kaplony was assistant professor and then professor emeritus of Egyptology at the Oriental Institute of the University of Zurich. His studies were especially focused on the pre-dynastic and early dynastic periods of Egypt and he published mostly in German and Swiss research journals.

== Publications ==
- The Egyptian inscriptions of the early days. 4 volumes, Harrassowitz, Wiesbaden from 1963 to 1964
- The cylinder seals of the Old Kingdom. La Fondation Reine Élisabeth Égyptologique, Brussels 1981

== External sources ==
- Morris L. Bierbrier: Who was who in Egyptology, 4th revised edition. Egypt Exploration Society, London (2012), ISBN 978-0-85698-207-1, page 289.
