= Sekhemib-Perenmaat =

Egyptian pharaoh

Sekhemib
- Sekhemib-Perenma'at
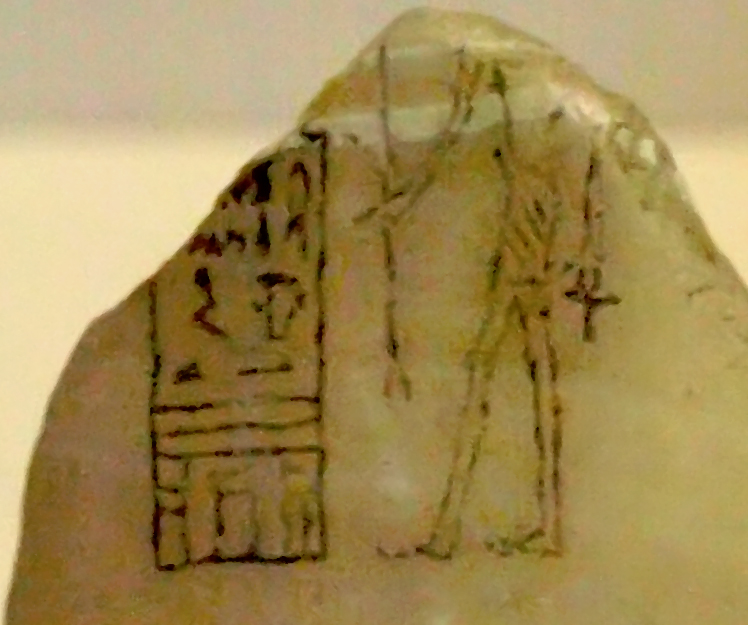
- Alabaster vessel showing the (damaged) double name of Sekhemib

Pharaoh
- Reign: c. 2720 BCE
- Predecessor: uncertain, Peribsen?, Nynetjer?
- Successor: uncertain, Peribsen? Khasekhemwy?
Royal titulary
Horus name
Hor-Sekhemib
Ḥr-Sḫm-jb
He with the powerful force of will of Horus
G5	S29 S42 F34
Hor-Sekhemib-Perenma´at
Ḥr-Sḫm-jb-pr-n-m3ˁt
He with a powerful force of will,
he comes forth for the Ma´at of Horus
G5	S29 S42 F34 O1 n U5 t
Nebty name
Sekhemib-Perenma'at-Nebty
Sḫm-jb-pr-n-m3ˁt-Nb.tj
He with the powerful force of will of the two ladies,
he comes forth for their Ma´at
G16 S29 S42 F34 O1 n U5 t
Full royal title
Nisut-Bity-Nebty-Sekhemib-Perenma'at
Nsw.t-btj-nb.ty-Sḫm-jb-pr-n-m3ˁt
King of Lower and Upper Egypt,
He of the two ladies,
with the powerful force of will,
who comes forth for the Ma'at
M23 t L2 t G16 S29 S42 F34 O1 n U5 t
- Burial: unknown
- Dynasty: 2nd dynasty

Sekhemib-Perenma'at (or simply Sekhemib), is the Horus name of an early Egyptian pharaoh who ruled during the 2nd Dynasty. Similar to his predecessor, successor, or co-ruler Seth-Peribsen, Sekhemib is well attested in contemporary, archaeological records, but does not appear in any posthumous documentation. The exact length of his reign is unknown, and his burial site has yet to be identified.

== Name sources ==
Sekhemib's name is known from seal impressions and from inscriptions on vessels made of alabaster and breccia. They were found in the entrance of Peribsen's tomb at Abydos, in the underground galleries beneath the step pyramid of (3rd Dynasty) king Djoser at Sakkara and on one excavation site at Elephantine.

Sekhemib's serekh name is notable, as it is the first in Egyptian history to be extended with an epithet. Beside the first name, Sekhem-ib, several seal impressions and stone vessel inscriptions show the epithet Perenma'at inside the serekh. Sekhemib used both name forms, the single horus name and the double name, at the same time. Egyptologists such as Herman te Velde and Wolfgang Helck think that the double name of Sekhemib came in use when the Egyptian state was split into two independent realms. It seems that Sekhemib tried to stress the peaceful political situation prevailing in Egypt at the time. An increased form of such a double name was created and used by a successor of Sekhemib, king Khasekhemwy. This king also used a double name and even placed Horus and Seth together as protective deities atop his serekh. Khasekhemwy had tried to express peace and reconciliation between Upper- and Lower Egypt with his unusual serekh, too.

== Identity ==
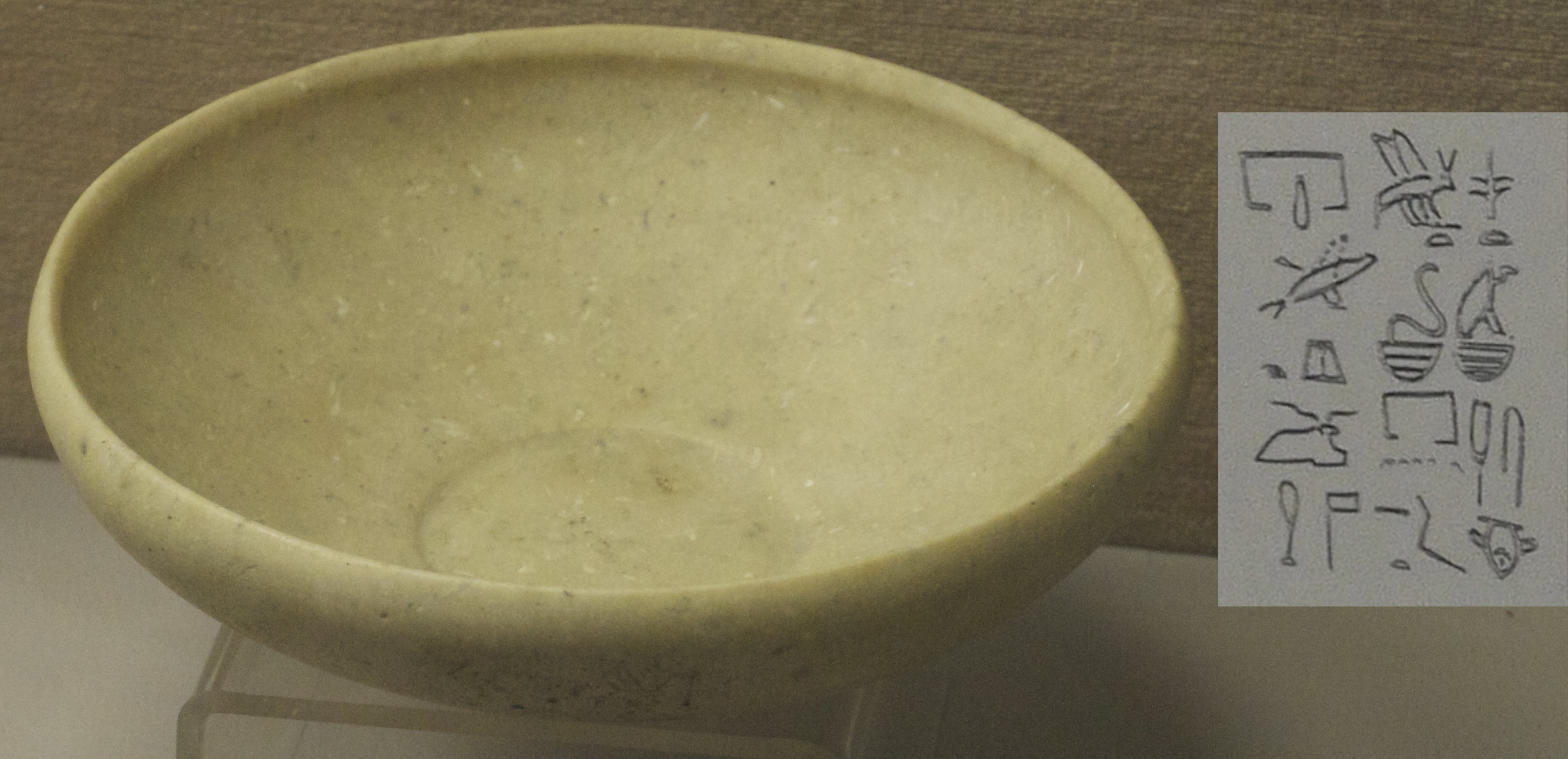
Vase of Sekhemib bearing the inscription reproduced on the right. At its right, it reads The king of Upper and Lower Egypt, Sekhemib-Perenmaat, at its left it reads administrator of the house of copper, god servant of Kherty, National Archaeological Museum (France).

The historical figure of Sekhemib is the subject of investigation and discussions by Egyptologists and historians to this day. The contradictory findings allow room for plenty of interpretations and theories.

Egyptologists such as Walter Bryan Emery, Kathryn A. Bard and Flinders Petrie believe that Sekhemib was the same person as king Peribsen, a ruler who had connected his name with the deity Seth and who possibly ruled only Upper Egypt. Emery, Bard and Petrie point to several clay seals that were found in the tomb entrance of Peribsen's necropolis. Sekhemib's tomb has not yet been found.

In contrast, Egyptologists such as Hermann Alexander Schlögl, Wolfgang Helck, Peter Kaplony and Jochem Kahl believe that Sekhemib was a different ruler to Peribsen. They point out that the clay seals were only found at the entrance area of Peribsen's tomb and that none of them ever shows Peribsen and Sekhemib's names together in one inscription. They compare the findings with the ivory tablets of king Hotepsekhemwy found at the entrance of king Qaa's tomb. Therefore, Schlögl, Helck, Kaplony and Kahl are convinced that Sekhemib's seals are merely proof that Sekhemib buried Peribsen.

Egyptologists such as Toby Wilkinson and Helck believe that Sekhemib and Peribsen could have been related. Their theory is based on the stone vessel inscriptions and seal impressions that show strong similarities in their typographical and grammatical writing styles. The vessels of Peribsen for example show the notation "ini-setjet" ("tribute of the people of Sethroë"), whilst Sekhemib's inscriptions note "ini-chasut" ("tribute of the desert nomads"). A further indication for a relationship between Peribsen and Sekhemib is the serekh-name of both, as they both use the syllables "per" and "ib" in their names.

Egyptologists such as Helck identify Sekhemib with the Ramesside cartouche name “Wadjenes” and equate Peribsen with a king named Senedj. Egyptologist Dietrich Wildung thinks alike and identifies Sekhemib with the nebty name Weneg-Nebty and Peribsen with Senedj.

== Reign ==
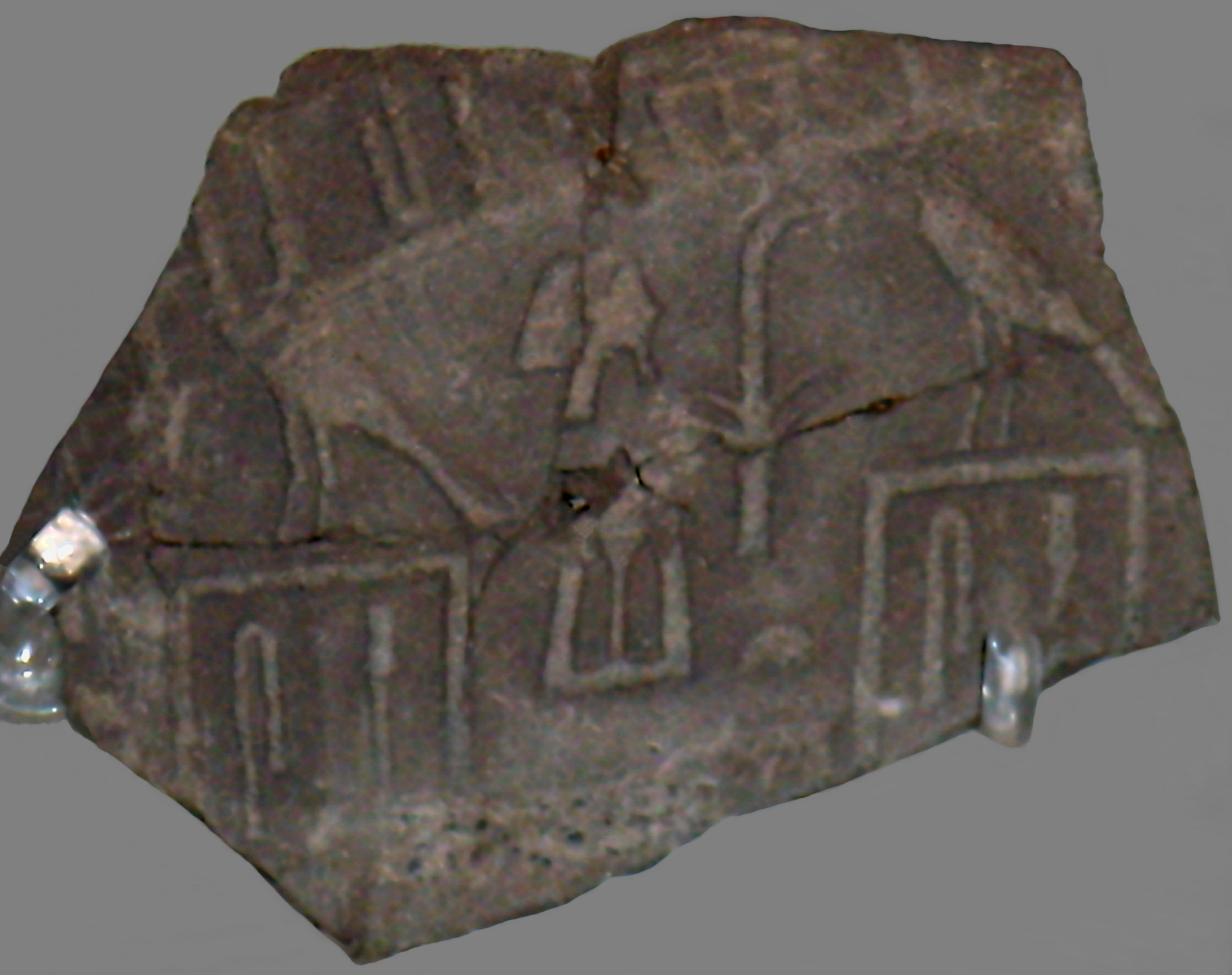
Clay seal of Sekhemib

There seems to be archaeological evidence that Sekhemib ruled only in Upper Egypt. His realm would have extended down from Ombos up to the Isle of Elephantine, where a new administrative centre called "The white house of treasury" was founded under Peribsen. It remains the subject of discussion by Egyptologists and historians as to if, why and when it was decided to split the state.

=== Proponents of the divided-realm-theory ===
Egyptologists such as Wolfgang Helck, Nicolas Grimal, Hermann Alexander Schlögl and Francesco Tiradritti believe that king Ninetjer, the third ruler of 2nd dynasty and a predecessor of Peribsen, left a realm that was suffering from an overly complex state administration and that Ninetjer decided to split Egypt between his two sons (or, at least, his two successors), in the hope that the two rulers could better administer the two states. Since the artefacts surviving from his lifetime seem to prove that he and his contemporary Peribsen ruled only in Upper Egypt, it is the subject of investigation as to who ruled in Lower Egypt at that time. The Ramesside king lists differ in their succession of royal names from king Senedj onward. A reason may be that the royal table of Saqqara and the royal canon of Turin reflect Memphite traditions, which allow Memphite rulers to be mentioned. The Abydos king list instead reflects Thinite traditions and therefore only Thinite rulers appear on that list. Until king Senedj, all posthumous king lists accord with each other. After him, the Saqqara list and the Turin list mention three kings as successors: Neferkara I, Neferkasokar and Hudjefa I. The Abydos king list skips these kings and jumps forward to Khasekhemwy, calling him “Djadjay”. The discrepancies are considered by Egyptologists to be the result of the partition of the Egyptian state during the 2nd Dynasty.

A further problem is the Horus names and Nebty names of different kings in inscriptions found in the Great Southern Gallery in the necropolis of (3rd Dynasty) king Djoser at Saqqara. Stone vessel inscriptions mention kings such as Nubnefer, Weneg-Nebty, Horus Ba, Horus "Bird" and Za, but each of these kings is mentioned only a few times, which suggests to Egyptologists that each of these kings did not rule very long. King Sneferka might be identical with king Qa'a or an ephemeral successor of his. King Weneg-Nebty might be identical with the Ramesside cartouche name Wadjenes. But kings such as "Nubnefer", "Bird" and "Za" remain a mystery. They never appear anywhere else in the historical record other than at Saqqara where the number of objects surviving from their lifetimes is very limited. Schlögl, Helck and Peter Kaplony postulate that Nubnefer, Za and Bird were the corresponding rulers to Peribsen and Sekhemib and ruled in Lower Egypt, whilst the latter two ruled Upper Egypt.

In contrast, Egyptologists such as Barbara Bell believe that an economic catastrophe such as a famine or a long-lasting drought affected Egypt at that time. To help solve the problems of feeding the Egyptian population, Ninetjer split the realm and his successors ruled two independent realms until the famine was successfully brought to an end. Bell points to the inscriptions of the Palermo stone, where, in her opinion, the records of the Nile floods show consistently low levels.

The administrative titles of the scribes, seal-bearers and overseers were adjusted to the new political situation. For example, titles like "sealer of the king" were changed into "sealer of the king of Upper Egypt". The administration system since the time of Peribsen and Sekhemib shows a clear and well identified hierarchy; an example: Treasury house → pension office → property → vine yards → private vine yard. King Khasekhemwy, the last ruler of 2nd Dynasty, was able to re-unify the state administration of Egypt and therefore unite the whole of Ancient Egypt. He brought the two treasury houses of Egypt under the control of the "House of the King", bringing them into a new, single administration center.

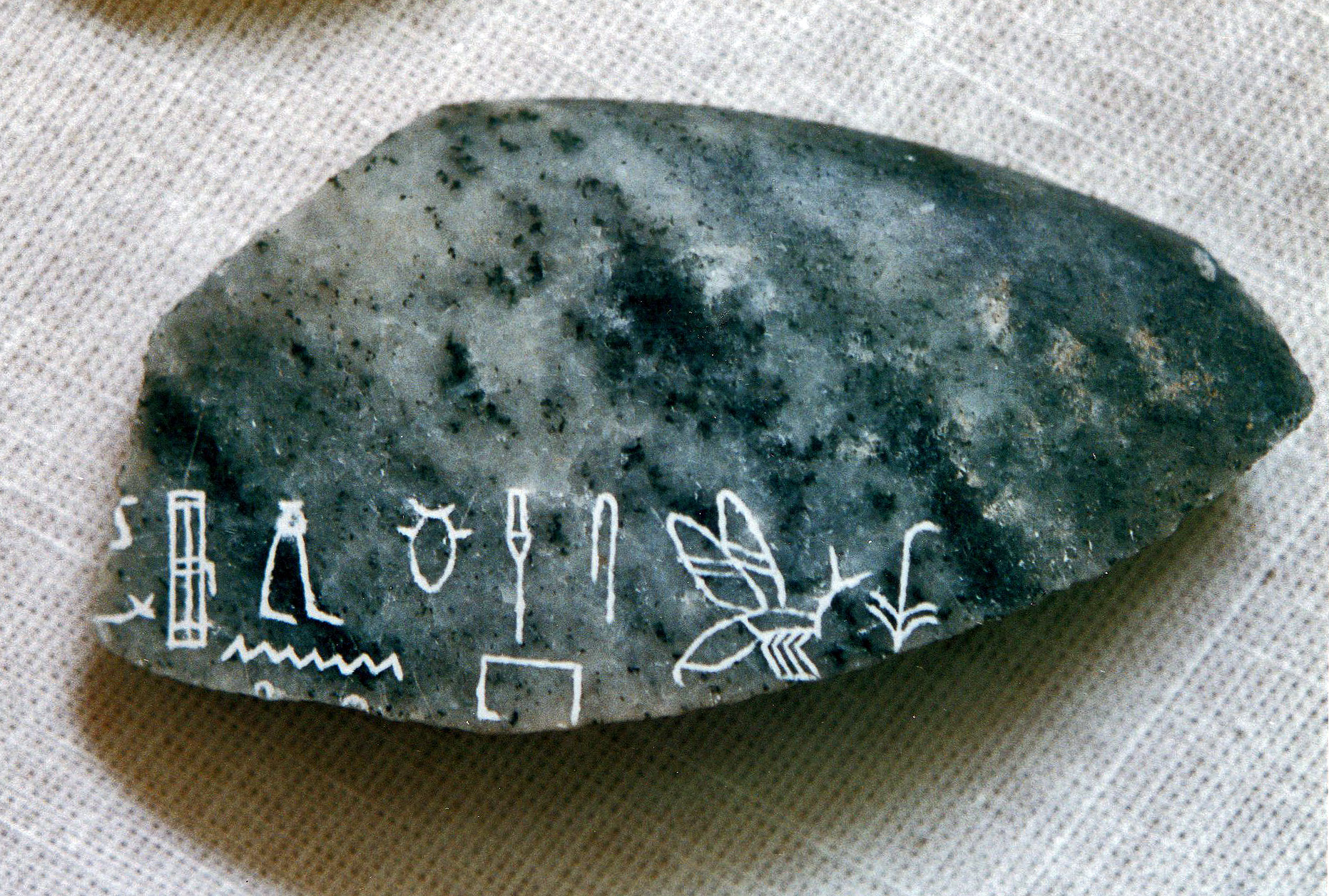
Fragment of a diorite vase inscribed with part of the name of pharaoh Sekhemib Perenmaat from the Pyramid of Djoser and now in the Egyptian Museum. The inscription reads (from right to left): "King of Lower- and Upper Egypt, Sekhemib-Per(enma'at), tribute of the foreigners, provisions to...".

=== Opponents of the divided-realm-theory ===
Other Egyptologists, such as Michael Rice, Francesco Tiradritti and Wolfgang Helck, believe that there was no division of the Egyptian thrones and that Sekhemib and Peribsen were each sole and independent rulers. The suspected division may have been of a mere bureaucratic nature, including changes in the titles of high-ranking officials. It is possible, that king Nynetjer (or Peribsen) decided to split the whole bureaucracy of Egypt into two separate departments in an attempt to reduce the power of the officials. Such an act was not surprising and occurred several times in Egyptian history, especially in later dynasties. The scholars also point to the once palatial and well preserved mastaba tombs at Saqqara and Abydos belonging to high officials such as Ruaben and Nefer-Setekh. These are all dated from the reign of Nynetjer to that of Khasekhemwy, the last ruler of the Second Dynasty. Egyptologists consider the archaeological record of the mastabas' condition and the original architecture as proof that the statewide mortuary cults for kings and noblemen successfully operated during the entire dynasty. If true, their preservation is inconsistent with the theory of civil wars and economic problems during Peribsen's reign. Rice, Tiradritti and Helck think that Nynetjer decided to leave a divided realm because of private or political reasons and that the split was a formality sustained by Second Dynasty kings.

Scholars such as Herman TeVelde, I. E. S. Edwards and Toby Wilkinson believe the inscription of the famous Annal stone of Fifth Dynasty, a black olivine-basalt slabstone displaying a very detailed king list, also argues against the division of the realm. On the stone, the kings are listed by their Horus name, their gold name, their cartouche name, and, finally, with the name of their royal mother. The lists also contain rectangular windows presenting year events from the day of the king's coronation to his death. The most famous fragments of the Annal stone are called the Palermo Stone and the Cairo Stone. On the Cairo stone, in line IV, the last nine years of king Nynetjer are preserved (but most of the year windows are illegible now). The Annal stone however, gives absolutely no indication of a division of the Egyptian realm. Barta, TeVelde, Wilkinson and Edwards argue that the theory of state division is untenable. A mere administrative reorganization of the bureaucracy or a split in the priesthood sects seems more likely.

Bell's theory of a famine or drought is refuted today by Egyptologists such as Stephan Seidlmayer, who corrected Bell's calculations. Seidlmayer has shown that the annual Nile flood was normal during Ninetjer's time up to the period of the Old Kingdom. Bell may have overlooked that the height of the Nile floods in the Palermo stone inscriptions only takes into account the measurements of the nilometers around Memphis, and not elsewhere along the river. Any long-lasting drought at that time can therefore be excluded.

Three officials from Sekhemib's reign are known to Egyptologists by seal impressions: Nebhotep, Inykhnum and Maapermin. However, Inykhnum might also have held office in later times, under kings such as Djoser and Sanakht.

== Tomb ==
It is unknown where Sekhemib was buried. If he was actually the same person as Peribsen, he was buried in tomb P at Abydos. If not, his burial site may be located at Saqqara.

While Sekhemib's tomb hasn't been positively identified, seal impressions and inscriptions on vessels, bowls and vases with his name were found, along with other objects from 1st and 2nd dynasty pharaohs in the shafts VI–XI of the Step Pyramid of Djoser. It is now thought that Djoser once restored the original tombs of the ancestors, and then sealed the grave goods in the galleries in an attempt to save them. This may indicate that Sekhemib's tomb had already been looted in antiquity, but this hypothesis is unproven.
