= Inykhnum =

Egyptian high-ranking official

- Iry-pat
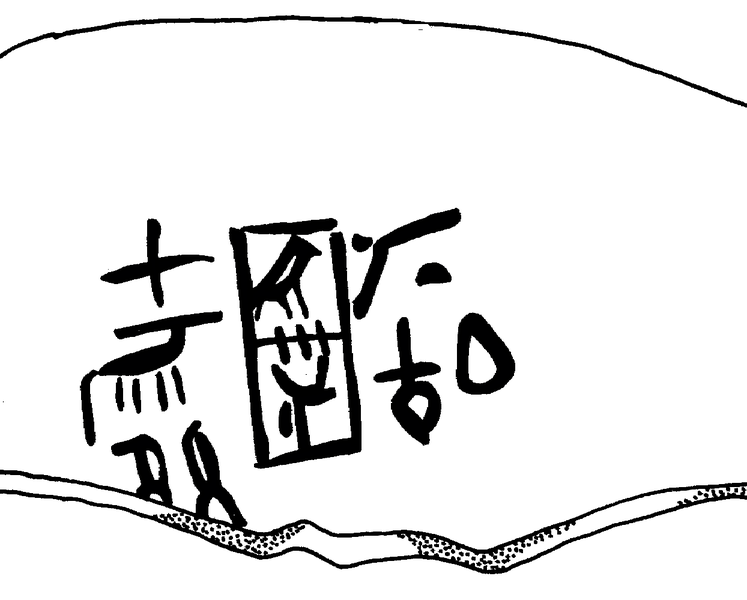
- Stone bowl fragment with the name of Inykhnum (left) and the possible ka-house of King Za (middle).
Egyptian name
W9 E10 M18 n Inykhnum / Khnum-iny
Ijnj-ḫnm
Khnum comes to me

Inykhnum (also read as Khnum-Iny) was an ancient Egyptian high-ranking official who worked and lived during the transition time between Second and Third Dynasty of Egypt. The king(s) under which he served are not known for certain, the subject being currently highly disputed.

== Attestations ==
Inykhnum's name appears exclusively in black ink inscriptions on alabaster shards and vessel fragments as well as on a few limestone shards. These artifacts were found beneath the step pyramid in the eastern galleries of the necropolis of pharaoh Djoser (3rd dynasty) at Saqqara and in the great fort Shunet el-Zebib of king Khasekhemwy (end of 2nd dynasty) at Abydos. Additional findings bearing Inykhnum's name come from two private mastaba tombs at Saqqara and from the pyramid of king Sekhemkhet. The ink inscriptions are short and written in hieratic writings.

== Identity ==
=== Name ===
Inykhnum's name is connected to the deity Khnum. Toby A. H. Wilkinson translates the name with "Khnum is my father" and evaluates this as a proof for an upcoming cult of Khnum during the reign of king Nynetjer.

=== Titles ===
As a high-ranking official and priest, Inykhnum owned elite and pious titles:

- Member of the elite (Egypt. Iry-pat)
- Valet of the king (Egypt. Hery-tep nesw)
- Sem-priest (Egypt. Sem)
- God servant of Khnum (Egypt. Hem-netjer Khnum)

Iny-khnum's titles are typical for a member of the royal family, especially for princes. The inscriptions furthermore reveal that Inykhnum participated in a Hebsed festival. He possibly shared his services and works with an office partner named Ma'a-aper-Min.

=== Career ===
Ilona Regulski and Peter Kaplony are convinced that Inykhnum held his office some time between the end of Khasekhemwy's and the beginning of Sekhemkhet's reigns. Earlier assumptions made by Wolfgang Helck, who dated Inykhnum's ink inscriptions to the time of Nynetjer (3rd ruler of 2nd dynasty), are questioned by Ilona Regulski. She points to comparisons between the ink inscriptions from Abydos and findings from Saqqara with contemporary cursive writings from the 2nd and early 3rd dynasties. First, Regulski remarks that the "17th time of the cattle count" appearing alongside the official's name, is a way of writing which was not common until the reign of Djoser. Additionally, if the cattle count was celebrated every second year as was the case during the Old Kingdom, Inykhnum must have served a king reigning for at least 34 years. Such a long reign is only attested for king Nynetjer of the early 2nd dynasty. However, Regulski suspects that Khasekhemwy or Djoser may have ruled longer than thought.

Furthermore, special font designs appearing together with Inykhnum's name were not yet common during Nynetjer's time on the throne. In particular, Regulski points to special hieroglyphs and their spellings within the hieratic writing: the zigzag-shaped hieroglyph N35 (water line; value "n") was still visibly jagged when written cursively under king Nynetjer, but from the reign of king Peribsen onwards it was written as a simple horizontal line with thickened ends. This is precisely the writing form that appears in the ink inscriptions of Inykhnum. Another hieroglyph, the sign Aa1 (human placenta; value "kh") was depicted as a simple ring or circle during Ninetjer's lifetime, while from king Sekhemib onwards it was written with the familiar horizontal hashing inside the circle. In cursive hieratic writings this sign appears as a circle with one or two fattened, horizontal or diagonal lines. This is also the case in the ink inscriptions of Inykhnum. Thus, according to Regulski, the typographics of the ink inscriptions lead to a secure datation of Inykhnum's life some time between the end of Khasekhemwy's reign and the very beginning of king Sekhemkhet's reign.

=== Evaluation of Inykhnum's ink inscriptions ===
Inykhnum's ink inscriptions are of great importance to egyptologists and historians alike. Not only do they show the development of the hieratic writing, but also they mention a special building alongside Inykhnum's name: it is a Ka-house, the forerunner of the later mortuary temple. The writings inside the Ka-house point to an obscure king of 2nd dynasty: Horus Za. The existence and identity of this king are highly disputed, in particular because his name never appears inside a royal serekh. Therefore, it is unknown, when and for how long did king Za ruled.

== Burial ==
Inykhnum's burial is unknown, W. Helck and J. Spencer list mastaba tombs S2429 and S3009 at Saqqara as possible burial sites.

== Sources ==
- Peter Kaplony: Die Inschriften der Ägyptischen Frühzeit. Vol. I, Harrassowitz, Wiesbaden 1963.
- Pierre Lacau, Jan-Phillip Lauer: La Pyramide a Degrees. Vol. IV: Inscriptions Gravees sur les Vases: Fouilles à Saqqarah. Service des antiquités de l’Égypte, Kairo 1936.
- Dilwyn Jones: An Index of ancient Egyptian titles, epithets and phrases of the Old Kingdom. Archaeopress, Oxford 2000, ISBN 1-84171-069-5.
- Ilona Regulski: Second dynasty ink inscriptions from Saqqara paralleled in the Abydos material from the Royal Museums of Art and History in Brussels. In: Stan Hendrickx, R.F. Friedman, Barbara Adams & K. M. Cialowicz: Egypt at its origins. Studies in memory of Barbara Adams. Proceedings of the international Conference „Origin of the State, Predynastic and Early Dynastic Egypt“, Kraków, 28th August – 1st September 2002 (= Orientalia Lovaniensia analecta. Vol. 138). Peeters Publishers, Leuven (NL) 2004, ISBN 90-429-1469-6.
