= Heracleopolis Parva =

Settlement in ancient Egypt

Heracleopolis Parva Ἡρακλέους πόλις Μικρά Sethroe, Heracleus
- Ancient city
- Location in Egypt
- Coordinates: 30°58′43.33″N 32°10′23.15″E
- Country: Egypt
- Time zone: UTC+2 (EST)

Heracleopolis Parva (Koine Greek: Ἡρακλεόπολις Μικρά), also called Sethroe, is an ancient Egyptian city identified with the modern site of Tell Belim, Sharqia Governorate. It was the capital of the 14th Nome of Ancient Egypt, Khenti-Iabti, known to the Greeks as Sethroites (Koine Greek: Σεθρωίτης).

Almost completely destroyed and cut off by fish-farm lagoons, the ancient city is now a tell.

== Etymology ==
The Greek name for the city is Herakleopolis-Mikra, named after the Greek hero Herakles. Heracleopolis Parva is "Little Heracleus City" in Latin. The Egyptian name is "Per-Harsaphes-Neb-Nen-Nesou" (pr-ḥryšf nb-ḥwt-nỉswt-n-šrỉ, meaning: "House of Harsaphes, Lord of Heracleopolis").

== History ==
The city is mentioned only in later times of Egyptian history. Seth-Peribsen of the Second Dynasty may have conquered the city when he defeated the Setjet, a peoples identified with a region to the northeast [of Egypt]. The city was visited by Vespasian (Roman emperor from 69 to 79 AD) as recorded by Josephus in the Jewish War: "(...) all night (Vespasian) was at a small city called Tanis. His second station was Heracleopolis, and his third Pelusium." In the Antonine Itinerary, Heracleopolis Parva is located between Tanis and Pelusium. Ptolemy (100 to 170 AD) in Geography (II-VII) mentions "Little Herakleous city" as being east of the Boubastikos river. Sozomen of Gaza (400 to 450 AD) in Ecclesiastical History referring to Anthony the Great, mentions Heraclea as being situated on the Egyptian border, and how he (Antony) was sought out by Constantine the Great (Roman emperor from 306 to 337 AD) for intercession.

== Tell Belim ==
Tell Belim
- Interactive map of Tell Belim
- 30.97870171°N 32.17309693°E
- Location: Sharqia, Egypt
- Region: Nile Delta

The modern site of Tell Belim was noted by the Egypt Exploration Society (EES) as being 1km in length. Its surface had visible outlines of ancient houses and a temple-enclosure.

Tell Belim was visited by Petrie but was dated erroneously as "Late Roman or Cufic on the surface". The Roman material is mainly limited to the east part of the mound and the cemetery, whilst the west seems to be all of pharaonic date, overlaid by Ptolemaic debris. A Twenty-sixth Dynasty temple discovered in Tell Belim is of modest proportions, constructed by meager means. One reason for the absence of a more substantial temple may have been the remote location of the town, far from quarry sites and close to the north-eastern Levantine frontier. The quantity of hard stone in situ suggests an important building was constructed at some period, as one of the numerous basalt blocks has nswt-bjtj and the beginning of a cartouche 'Wsr-[Maat]-R' inscribed. A discovery of part of a pre-existing temple enclosure is evidence for a temple having existed at the site before the Twenty-sixth Dynasty.

The tell is mentioned in the Zondervan Encyclopedia of the Bible (2010), being tentatively identified with the location Hanes in Isaiah 30:4.

== See also ==
- Heracleopolis Magna
