= Seth-Peribsen =

Ancient Egyptian ruler

- Peribsen, Ash-Peribsen
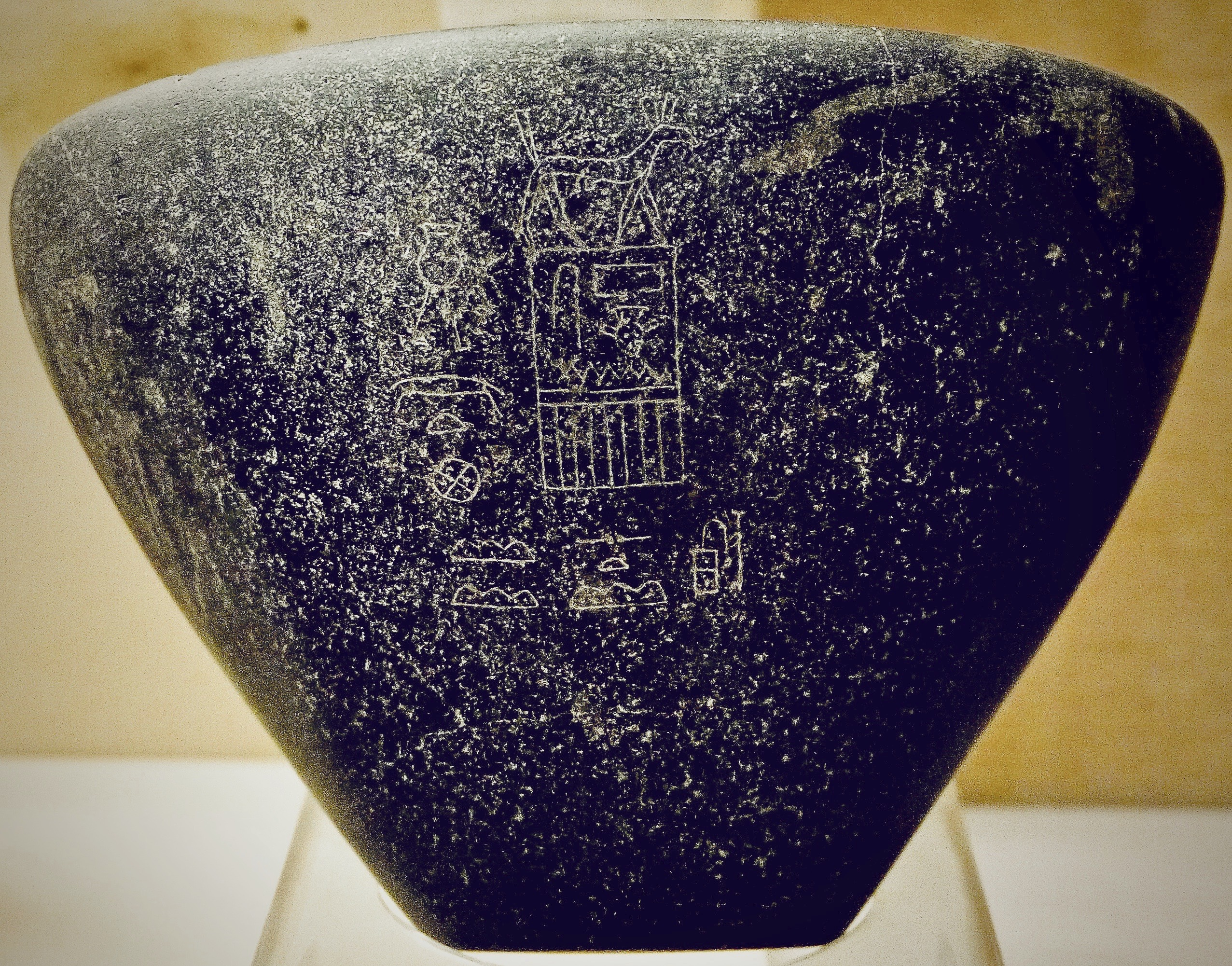
- Stone vase of Seth-Peribsen with the inscription "tribute of the people of Sethroë", National Archaeological Museum (France).

Pharaoh
- Reign: length of reign unknown
- Predecessor: uncertain; Wadjenes, Senedj, Sekhemib or Nynetjer
- Successor: uncertain; Senedj, Sekhemib or Khasekhemwy
Royal titulary
Horus name
Seth-Peribsen
Stš-pr-jb-sn
He who comes forth by the will of Seth
E20	pr F34 s n
also spelled
N5 E20	s pr F34 n
Prenomen
Nisut-bitj-Nebty-Peribsen
nsw.t-bjtj-nbtj-Pr.-jb-sn
King of Upper and Lower Egypt, he of the Two Ladies, Peribsen
M23 X1 L2 X1 G16 O1 F34 S29 n
Nomen
Saqqara, tomb of Shery (4th dynasty)
Peribsen
Pr.-jb-sn
He who comes forth by their will
< O1 D21 F34 S29 n >
- Children: Shepset-ipet ?
- Burial: Tomb 'P' at Abydos
- Dynasty: 2nd Dynasty; around 2740 BC

Seth-Peribsen (also known as Ash-Peribsen, Peribsen and Perabsen) is the serekh name of an early Egyptian monarch (pharaoh), who ruled during the Second Dynasty of Egypt (c. 2890 – c. 2686 BC). His chronological position within this dynasty is unknown and it is disputed who ruled both before and after him. The duration of his reign is also unknown.

Peribsen's name is unusual, in that Set, not Horus, was his patron deity and in his royal titulary. This goes against the Egyptian tradition of a king choosing the falcon-shaped deity Horus as his royal patron. However, Khasekhemwy, Seth-Peribsen's presumed successor, and the last king of the Second Dynasty of Egypt also included the Seth animal in his king's name. This variation is not attested in any other period of ancient Egypt, despite the close connection of the gods throughout the entire dynastic period.

Peribsen's tomb was discovered in 1898 at Abydos. It was well preserved and showed traces of restoration undertaken during later dynastic periods.

== Attestations ==
=== Contemporaneous sources ===
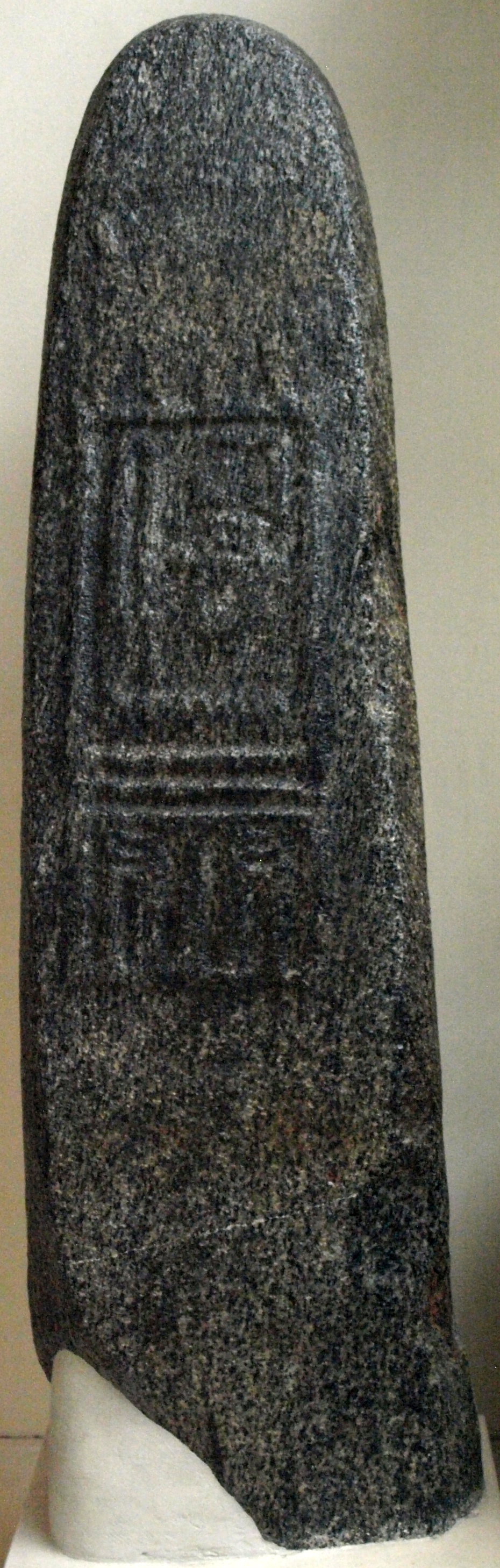
Granodiorite tomb stela of Peribsen, now on display at the British Museum

The serekh for Peribsen was found pressed in earthen jar seals made of clay and mud and in inscriptions on alabaster, sandstone, porphyry and black schist vessels. These seals and vessels were excavated from Peribsen's tomb and at an excavation site in Elephantine. One clay seal with Peribsen's name was found inside the mastaba tomb K1 at Beit Khallaf.

Two large tomb stelae made of granite were found at his burial site. Their shape is unusual and they appear unfinished and rough. Egyptologists suspect that this was done deliberately, but the reasons are unknown. A cylinder seal of unknown provenance shows Peribsen's name inside a cartouche and gives the epithet Merj-netjeru ("beloved of the gods"). This arrangement leads Egyptologists and archaeologists to the conclusion that the seal must have been created later, in memoriam, because the use of royal cartouches began long after Peribsen's reign. Another seal of the same material shows Peribsen's name without a cartouche, but with the royal title Nisut-Bity ("king of Upper- and Lower Egypt") instead.

=== Historical sources ===
Existing skeptical views about Peribsen's existence are based on New Kingdom Ramesside king lists, such as the Abydos King List, the Saqqara King List and the Royal Canon of Turin, which all omit Peribsen's name. These, however, are known to have been created nearly 1,500 years after his death and several Fourth Dynasty tombs of priests performing the funerary cult for Peribsen have been uncovered. These tombs report Peribsen's name correctly and their existence demonstrates that Peribsen was seen as a legitimate pharaoh, not subject to damnatio memoriae as Akhenaten later would be. Historians and Egyptologists therefore consider the possibility that Peribsen's name was actually forgotten over time or that his name was preserved in a distorted, misspelled form.

== Name ==
Peribsen's royal name is a subject of curiosity for Egyptologists because it is connected to the deity Seth rather than Horus, as was traditional for the name of a pharaoh. Traditionally, the Horus name of the king was written within a serekh: the image of the facade of the royal palace beneath a falcon representing the god Horus (see Egyptian hieroglyphs). Instead, Peribsen chose to have the Set animal, representing Seth, on his serekh. Although Peribsen is the only known pharaoh to have the Set animal preside alone over his serekh, he is not the only king to associate himself with Seth. Examples include the 13th Dynasty pharaoh Seth Meribre, the 19th Dynasty rulers Seti I and Seti II and the 20th Dynasty king Setnakhte.

The debate continues over why Peribsen chose this name. Earlier theories favoured the idea that Egypt was split into two realms during Peribsen's time or that he was a heretic who sought to start a new monotheistic religion with Seth as the only worshipped god. However, newer evidence and evaluations tend to show that the Egyptian kingdom was unified, but witnessed a vast and profound reform during the Second Dynasty. Seal impressions from tombs of this era reveal great changes in the titles held by high officials, pointing to a reduction of their power. Further seal impressions show that several deities were worshipped under Peribsen, refuting the monotheism theory. Other contemporary inscriptions indicate that Egyptian grammar was perfected during his time: In particular, the earliest seal impressions with complete sentences date back to Peribsen's reign. Thus, Peribsen's reign was in fact a time of cultural and religious advancement.

Peribsen's choice of patron, and his rule during the shadowy period of the mid-Second Dynasty, have led Egyptologists and historians to search for possible explanations for both his name and the troubled times he lived in. The following sections discuss some of the theories that they have put forth.

=== Religious theories uniting Peribsen with Seth ===
Inscription from a porphyry-vase displaying the serekh of Peribsen; note the Seth-animal with a sun-disk above.

==== Older theories ====
A theory that was popular until the mid-20th century, supported by Egyptologists Percy Newberry, Jaroslav Černý, Walter Bryan Emery and Bernhard Grdseloff held that Peribsen was a heretic who sought to introduce a new, monotheistic state religion to Egypt, with Seth as the only worshipped god. Peribsen's actions were thought to be similar to those of the much later 18th Dynasty pharaoh Akhenaten, who had required Egyptians to serve only the Aten. Newberry proposed that the priests of Horus and Seth fought each other "in the manner of a War of the Roses" during the second half of the Second Dynasty.

The "heretic Peribsen" theory was based on three observations: that the name "Peribsen" was excluded from later king lists (or perhaps substituted with the Ramesside name "Senedj"), that the king's tomb had been destroyed and plundered during antiquity and, finally, that the tomb stelae of Peribsen, that once displayed the Set animal, were badly scratched with the clear intention of effacing the Seth image. Egyptologists hypothesized these were the actions of religious opponents to the Sethian priest-caste. Lauer and Firth relied on the "heretic Peribsen" theory to explain the enormous quantity of stone vessels inscribed with the name of First and Second Dynasty kings found beneath Djoser's pyramid in bags bearing seals of Khasekhemwy and Djoser. They proposed that Peribsen had plundered the tombs of his predecessors, followers of Horus, and scattered their funerary equipment. These vessels were gathered in the royal treasury during Khasekhemwy's reign following his reunification of Egypt, and finally put beneath the Step Pyramid by Djoser, in an act of pious devotion.

==== Contemporary theories ====
Today this theory, as well as Lauer and Firth's conclusions, is widely questioned. Archaeological evidence of Peribsen has been found almost entirely in Upper Egypt. In particular, his name does not appear in Lower Egyptian records surviving from that time. It is argued that Peribsen may not have ruled over all of Egypt and therefore did not have the authority to force a change in state religion. Another piece of evidence that argues against the "heretic Peribsen" theory is the false door of the priest Shery at Saqqara. Shery held office during the early Fourth Dynasty. The inscription on the false door connects the name of Peribsen in one sentence with another shadowy king of the Second Dynasty, Senedj. According to the addendum, Shery was "overseer of all wab-priests of king Peribsen in the necropolis of king Senedj, in his mortuary temple and at all other places". This implies that the funerary cult of Peribsen continued at least until the Fourth Dynasty, inconsistent with the assumption that Peribsen's name was not allowed to be mentioned. Additionally, Egyptologists such as Herman te Velde point out that Shery was not the only Fourth Dynasty priest participating in the funerary cult of Peribsen. Inkef, possibly a brother or cousin of Shery, also held the title of a "supervisor of Ka-priests of Peribsen".

Seal impressions found in Peribsen's tomb at Abydos show several deities: Ash, Min and Bastet, suggesting they were venerated during Peribsen's time on the throne. This finding argues against Peribsen worshipping a single god, or promoting monotheism. The heretic theory of Newberry, Černý, Grdseloff and others was devised from the very limited archaeological information available during their lifetimes. Most of the clay seal impressions found were still undeciphered and untranslated in their time.

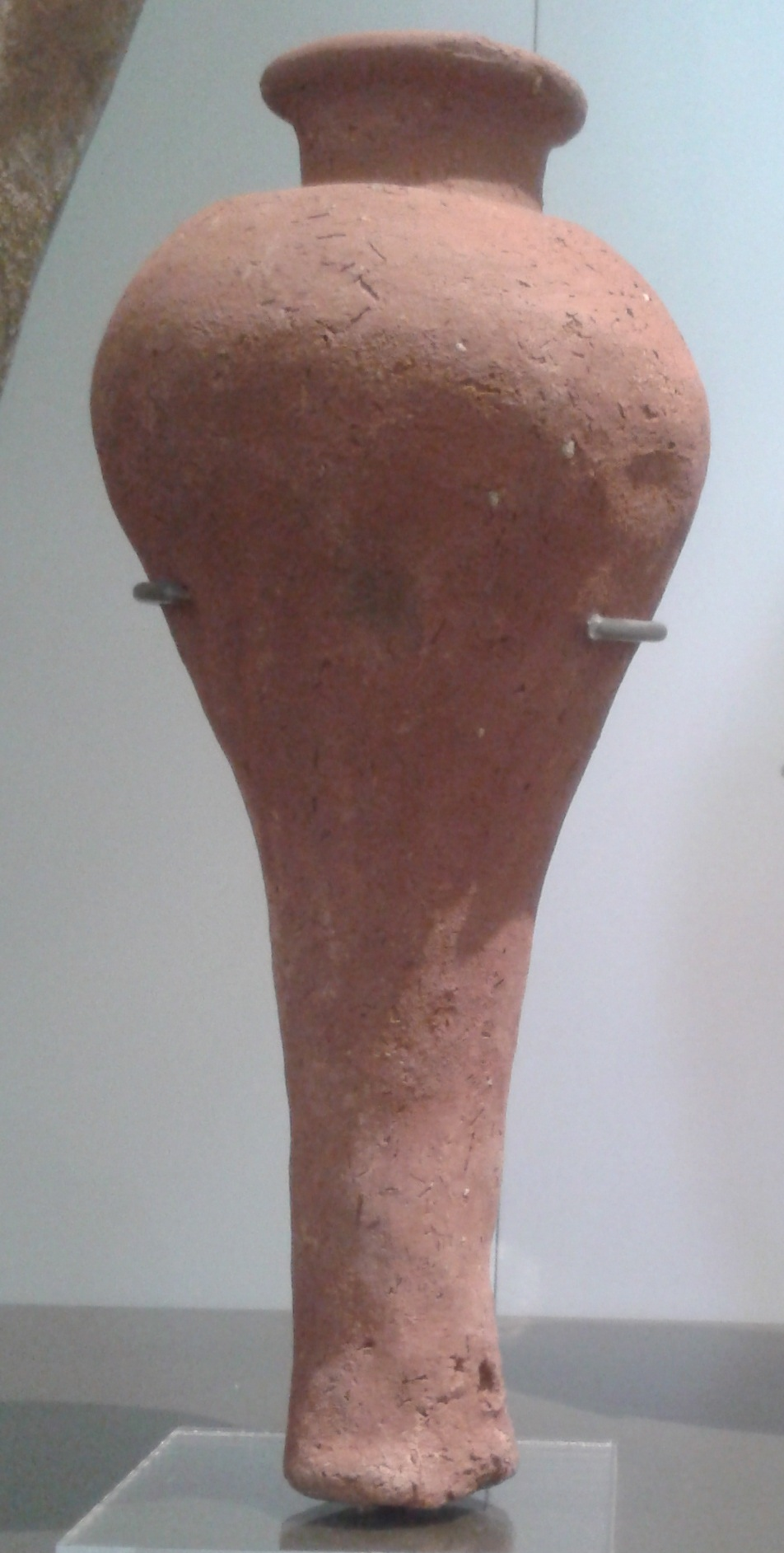
Vessel from the tomb of king Peribsen, Ashmolean Museum.

In the opinion of Sainte Fare Garnot (1956) and te Velde (1956), the name of "Peribsen" accords religious meaning, even before association with a deity. The name "Peribsen" literally means "He who comes forth by their will" or "His heart and will comes forth for them." The Egyptian syllable sn means "them, their, those", revealing a clear plural writing. Te Velde and Garnot are convinced that Peribsen used the heraldic Seth animal as a serekh patron, but also linked his name to Horus. If true, it would prove that Peribsen worshipped Horus and Seth on an equal footing during his lifetime. An ostentatious plural meaning with religious ambiguity was not uncommon for pharaohs' names in the early Egyptian dynasties. Peribsen may have been perceived as a living incarnation of both Horus and Seth in equal measure, just like his predecessors on the throne. Therefore, Peribsen's name may actually show no break in the sacred tradition; he added the power of Seth to Horus. As further examples, the titles of early dynastic queens used plural patron deities, such as "she who is allowed to see Horus and Seth" and "she who carries Horus and Seth". Similarly, the unusual serekh of king Khasekhemwy, the last ruler of the Second Dynasty, shows the deities Horus and Seth together atop the serekh. Horus wears the White Crown of Upper Egypt and Seth wears the Red Crown of Lower Egypt. The two gods are depicted facing each other in a kissing gesture. This special name was meant to illustrate the dual incarnation of the king as the representative of Horus and Seth, with power over all Egypt. Khasekhemwy's name can be interpreted as an advanced form of Peribsen's serekh name.

Egyptologists Ludwig David Morenz and Wolfgang Helck remark that the targeted gouging of Seth-animals did not occur until the New Kingdom of Egypt. The erasure of the Seth chimera on Peribsen's tomb stelae had been attributed to activity shortly after his death under the "heretic" theory; new discoveries suggested the defamation occurred centuries later. Historian Dietrich Wildung states that the necropolis of Abydos was not the only one plundered in antiquity: the tombs at Saqqara and Giza were also ransacked. Thus, he concludes that any targeted action against one particular pharaoh can be excluded.

=== Political theories ===
The earlier theories of Newberry, Černý and Grdseloff said that the Egyptian state under Peribsen suffered from several civil wars, either economic or political in origin. If he was held responsible for the putative misery in the past, this could explain why later king lists excluded Peribsen.

In contrast, more recent theories now hold that, if the Egyptian kingdom was divided, the division happened peacefully. Egyptologists such as Michael Rice, Francesco Tiradritti and Wolfgang Helck point to the once palatial and well preserved mastaba tombs at Saqqara and Abydos belonging to high officials such as Ruaben and Nefer-Setekh. These are all dated from the reign of Nynetjer to that of Khasekhemwy, the last ruler of the Second Dynasty. Egyptologists consider the archaeological record of the mastabas' condition and the original architecture as proof that the statewide mortuary cults for kings and noblemen operated successfully during the entire dynasty. If true, their preservation is inconsistent with the theory of civil wars and economic problems during Peribsen's reign. Rice, Tiradritti and Helck think that Nynetjer decided to leave a divided realm because of private or political reasons and that the split was a formality sustained by Second Dynasty kings.

The origin of the political division is unknown. It might have happened at the beginning of Peribsen's rule or shortly before. Because Peribsen chose the deity Seth as his new throne patron, Egyptologists are of the view that Peribsen was a chieftain from Thinis or a prince of the Thinite royal house. This theory is based on Seth being a deity of Thinite origin, which would explain Peribsen's choice: his name changing may have been nothing more than smart political (and religious) propaganda. Peribsen is thought to have gained the Thinite throne and ruled only Upper Egypt, whilst other rulers held the Memphite throne and ruled Lower Egypt.

== Identity ==
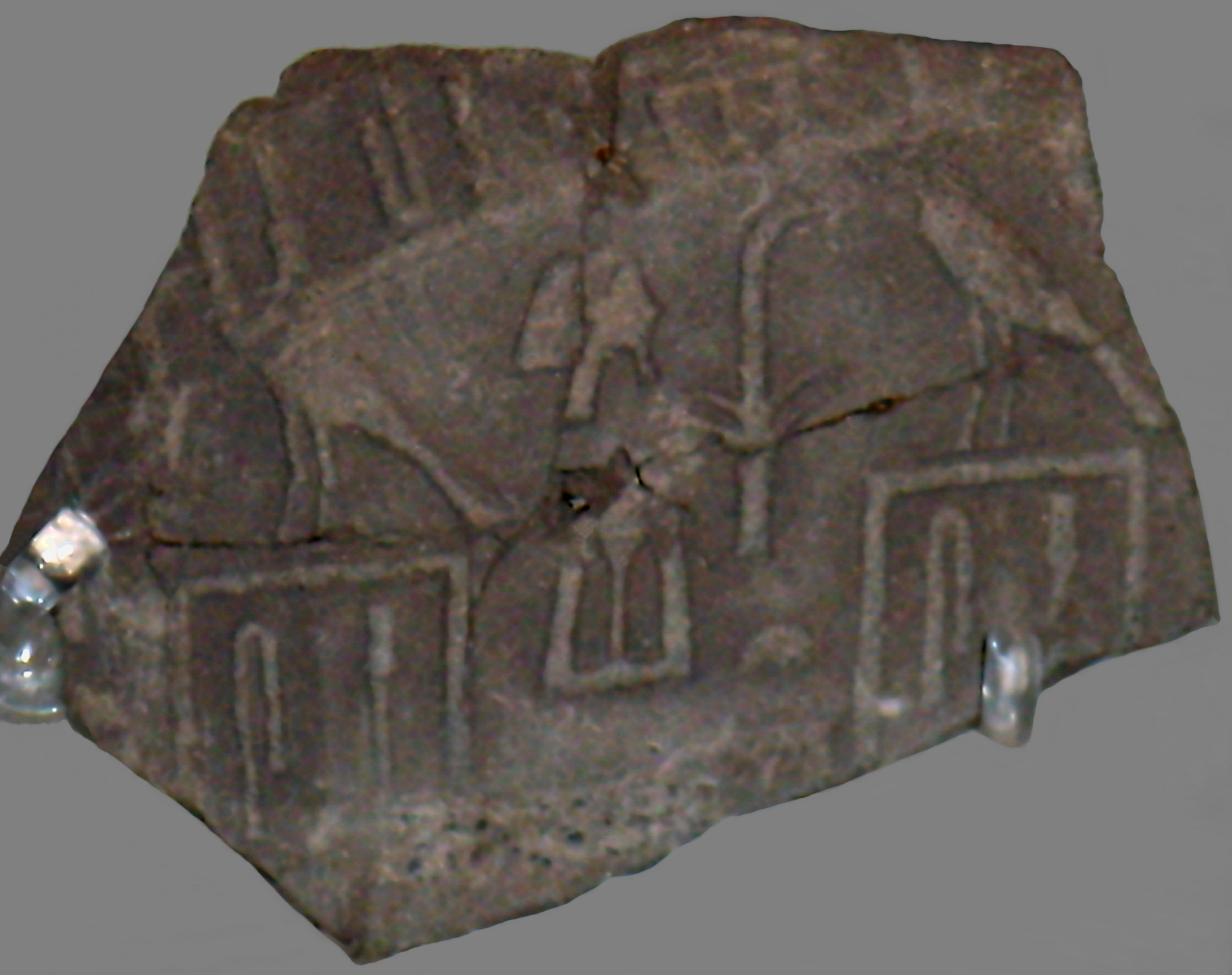
Seal impression of king Sekhemib from Abydos

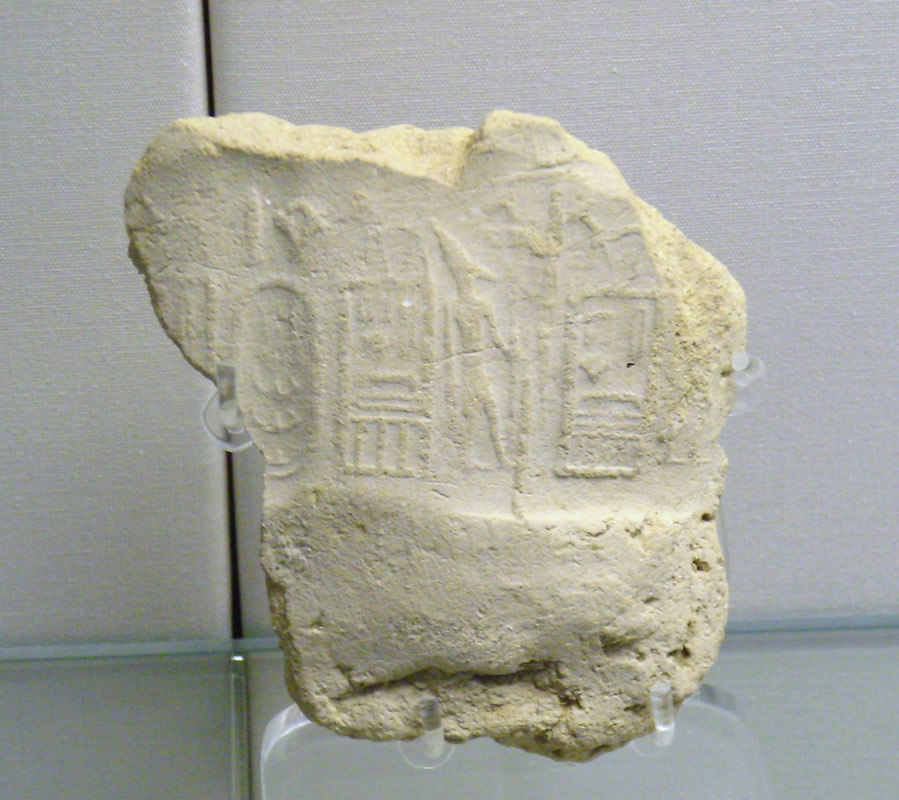
Seal impression of Peribsen

Egyptologists Walter Bryan Emery, Kathryn A. Bard and Flinders Petrie believe that Peribsen was also known as Sekhemib-Perenmaat, another Second Dynasty ruler that had connected his name with the falcon god Horus. As evidence, clay seals of Sekhemib found in the entrance of Peribsen's tomb support this hypothesis. Sekhemib's tomb has not yet been found.

This theory is debatable; Hermann Alexander Schlögl, Wolfgang Helck, Peter Kaplony and Jochem Kahl argue that the clay seals were only found at the entrance area of Peribsen's tomb and none of them depict Peribsen and Sekhemib's names together in one inscription. Furthermore, they remark that it was customary for a pharaoh to bury his predecessor and seal his tomb; the presence of Sekhemib's seals shows the line of dynastic inheritance. Similar inferences can be drawn from the ivory tablets of king Hotepsekhemwy found at the entrance of king Qa'a's tomb and the clay seals of Djoser found at the entrance of Khasekhemwy's tomb. Schlögl, Helck, Kaplony and Kahl are convinced that the discovery of Sekhemib's seals support the view that Sekhemib immediately succeeded Peribsen and buried him.

Scholars Toby Wilkinson and Helck believe that Peribsen and Sekhemib could have been related. Their theory is based on the stone vessel inscriptions and seal impressions that show strong similarities in their typography and grammar. The vessels of Peribsen show the notation "ini-setjet" ("tribute of the people of Sethroë"), whilst Sekhemib's inscriptions have the notation "ini-khasut" ("tribute of the desert nomads"). A further indication that Peribsen and Sekhemib were related is their serekh names; they both used the syllables "Per" and "ib" in their names.

The false door inscription of Shery might indicate that Peribsen is identical with king Senedj ("Senedj" means "the frightening") and that this name was used in the king lists by proxy, as the Seth name was forbidden to mention. In contrast, Dietrich Wildung and Wolfgang Helck identify Peribsen with the Ramesside cartouche name Wadjenes. They think it is possible that the name Per-ib-sen was misread from a sloppy hieratic inscription of Wadj-sen.

== Reign ==
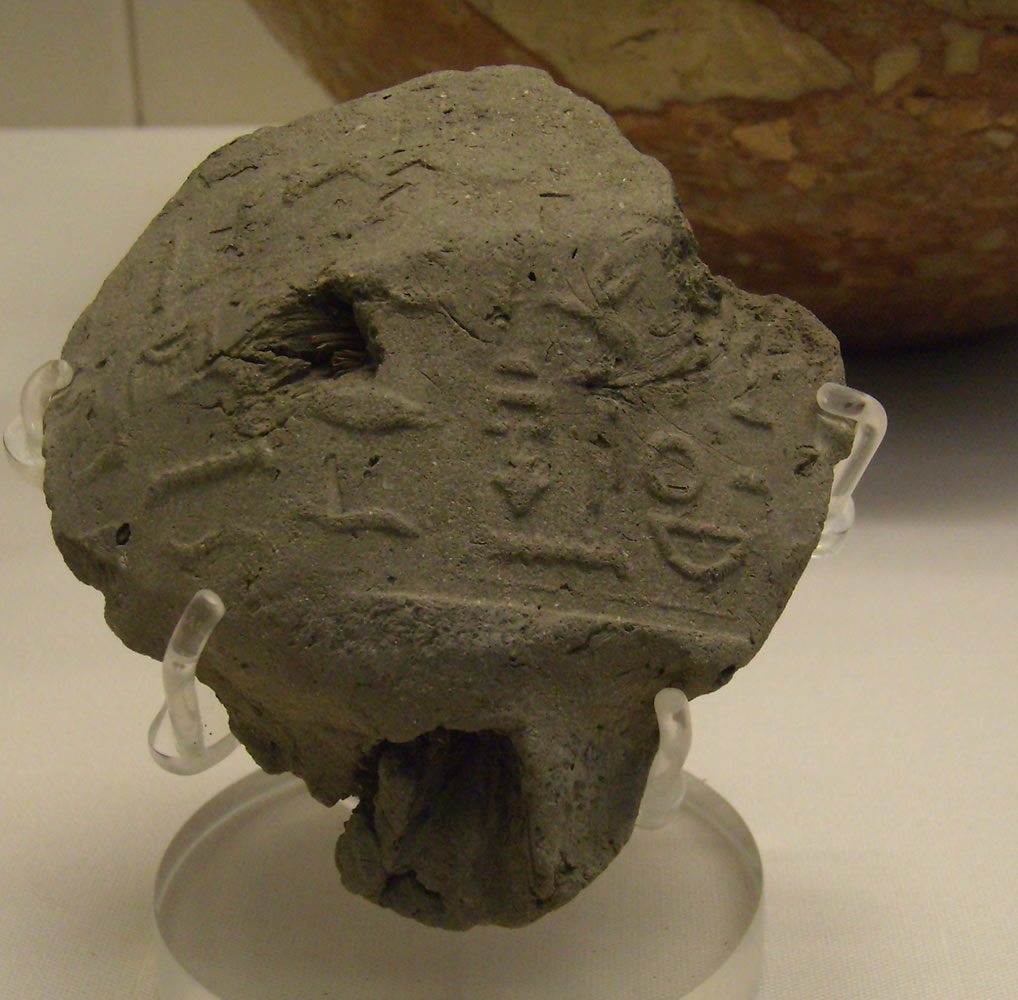
Seal impression from Peribsen's tomb with the first known complete sentence in Egyptian history: “Sealing of everything of Ombos (i.e., Naqada): He of Ombos has joined the Two Lands for his son, the Dual King Peribsen.”

As some archaeological records support the view that the Egyptian state was divided during Peribsen's reign, there is continued debate as to why his predecessors decided to divide the realm, and whether Peribsen ruled part or all of Egypt.

=== Proponents of the divided-realm-theory ===
Egyptologists Wolfgang Helck, Nicolas Grimal, Hermann Alexander Schlögl and Francesco Tiradritti believe that king Nynetjer, the third ruler of the Second dynasty and predecessor to Peribsen, ruled an Egypt that was suffering from an overly complex state administration. Nynetjer decided to split Egypt to leave it to two chosen successors who would rule two separate kingdoms, in the hope that the state administration could improve. Archaeological evidence, such as the imprinted clay seals and inscribed jars, appear to support the claim that Peribsen ruled only in Upper Egypt. A great number of these were found in Abydos, Naqada and at Elephantine, with only a single clay seal bearing his name found in Lower Egypt, at Beit Khallaf. Historians think Peribsen's realm would have extended from Naqada to the Isle of Elephantine. The rest of Egypt would therefore have been controlled by a different, coexisting ruler.

Egyptologist Dimitri B. Proussakov supports his theory with notations on the famous Palermo stone concerning the year events of king Nynetjer. From the twelfth year event onward, "The king of Upper- and Lower Egypt appears" was amended to "The king of Lower Egypt appears". Proussakov sees this as a strong indication that Nynetjer's power over Egypt had diminished. Egyptologists compare the situation to that of king Qa'a, one of the last rulers of the First Dynasty. When Qa'a died, obscure claimants appeared and battled for the throne of Egypt. The struggles reached an apex with the plundering of the royal cemetery at Abydos, whereupon the cemetery was abandoned and Saqqara became the new royal burial site. The conflict was ended by the ascension of king Hotepsekhemwy, the founder of the Second Dynasty.

Barbara Bell, another scholar, believes that an economic catastrophe such as a famine or a long-lasting drought affected Egypt. To better address the problem of feeding the Egyptian population, Nynetjer split the realm into two and his successors founded two independent realms, perhaps with intent to reunite after the famine. Bell points to the inscriptions of the Palermo stone, where, in her opinion, the records of the annual Nile floods show constantly low levels during this period. Bell's theory is refuted today by Egyptologists such as Stephan Seidlmayer, who asserts her calculations were incorrect. Seidlmayer has shown that the annual Nile floods were at usual levels at Nynetjer's time up to the period of the Old Kingdom. Bell overlooked that the heights of the Nile floods in the Palermo stone inscription take into account the measurements of the nilometers around Memphis, but not elsewhere along the river. A state-wide drought was unlikely.

Rulers of Lower and Upper Egypt

Egyptian historians such as Helck, Tiradritti, Schlögl, Emery and Grimal are convinced that Peribsen was a co-ruler. The investigation into the rulers of Lower Egypt is ongoing. The Rammesside king lists differ in their order of royal names from king Senedj onward. The royal table of Sakkara and the royal canon of Turin reflect Memphite traditions, which only allowed Memphite rulers to be mentioned. The Abydos king list reflects instead the Thinite traditions and therefore only Thinite rulers appear on that list. Until king Senedj, all the king lists are in agreement. After him, the Sakkara list and the Turin list mention three kings as successors: Neferkara I, Neferkasokar and Hudjefa I. The Abydos king list jumps forward to Khasekhemwy, calling him "Djadjay". The discrepancies are considered by Egyptologists to be the result of the division of Egypt during the Second dynasty.

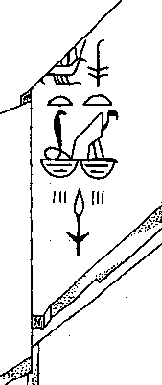
Alabaster fragment with the nebti-name Weneg.

Additional contradictory findings are the Horus and Nebty names of kings discovered in the Great Southern Gallery in the necropolis of the (Third dynasty) king Djoser at Sakkara. Stone vessel inscriptions mention the kings Nubnefer, Weneg-Nebty, Horus Ba, Horus "Bird" and Za; each of these is mentioned only a few times, suggesting their reigns were short. King Sneferka might be identical with king Qa'a or an ephemeral successor of his. King Weneg-Nebty might be identical with the Ramesside cartouche name Wadjenes. But kings such as "Nubnefer", "Bird" and "Za" remain a mystery. They never appear anywhere else and the number of objects surviving from their lifetimes is very limited. Schlögl, Helck and Peter Kaplony postulate, that Nubnefer, Za and Bird were contemporaries of Peribsen and Sekhemib and ruled over Lower Egypt, whilst the latter two ruled Upper Egypt.

=== Opponents of the divided-realm-theory ===
Scholars such as Herman TeVelde, I. E. S. Edwards and Toby Wilkinson believe the inscription of the famous Annal stone of Fifth dynasty, a black olivin-basalt slabstone displaying a very detailed king list, argues against the division of the realm. On the stone the kings from 1st to 7th dynasty are listed by their Horus name, their gold name and their cartouche name, their name banderoles end with the name of their royal mother. The lists also contain rectangular windows presenting year events from the day of king's coronation up to his death. The most famous fragments of the Annal stone are called Palermo Stone and Cairo Stone. On the Cairo stone, in line IV, the nine last years of king Nynetjer are preserved (but most of the year windows are illegible now). The date of Nynetjer's death is followed by a new king. Recent investigations reveal that the serekh of that new king is surmounted by a four-legged animal, not by the Horus-falcon. Since the only four-legged heraldic serekh animal in early Egypt was the chimera of the god Seth, despite passionate disagreement, the indicated ruler is likely to be Peribsen. Egyptologists such as TeVelde, Barta and Edwards do not agree; Peribsen might have not been the only king with a Seth-name. The year events under Nynetjer show increasing references to Seth, suggesting the tradition of a Horus name as the sole name of kings might have already evolved. The rise of a king allied with Seth was thus unsurprising. TeVelde, Barta and Edwards think that, in addition to Peribsen, the rulers Wadjenes, Nubnefer or Sened might have been Seth-kings as well; one of them surely was the true direct successor of Nynetjer. The comparatively large amount of archaeological finds from Peribsen's reign contradict the brief estimated length of rulership, only 10 to 12 years, as presented on the Annal stone.

The Annal stone gives absolutely no indication of a division of the Egyptian realm. Barta, TeVelde, Wilkinson and Edwards argue that the theory of state division is untenable. An administrative reorganization or split in the priesthood sects is more likely.

=== Political accomplishments ===
During his time on the throne, Peribsen founded an administrative center called "The white house of treasury" as well as a new royal residence, called the "protection of Nubt", located near Ombos ("Nubt" being the Ancient Egyptian name of Naqada). The administrative titles of scribes, seal-bearers and overseers were adjusted to correspond to the divided bureaucratic state administration. For example, titles like "sealer of the king" were changed into "sealer of the king of Upper Egypt". This bureaucratic reform may indicate an attempt by Peribsen to limit the power of these officials, further evidence for a bloated and unwieldy state administration under Nynetjer.

The administration system under Peribsen and Sekhemib had a clear and well-defined hierarchy; as an example, from highest to the lowest rank: Treasury house (royal and therefore highest in ranking) → pension office → property → vineyards → private vineyard (property of citizens and therefore lowest in ranking). King Khasekhemwy, the last ruler of the Second dynasty, was able to re-unify the state administration of Egypt and therefore unite the whole of Ancient Egypt. He brought the two treasury houses of Egypt under the control of the "House of the King", bringing them into a new, single administration centre.

Peribsen also founded royal edifices such as Per-nubt ("house of Ombos") and Per-Medjed ("house of meetings") and created several cities of economic importance. Their names, Afnut ("city of the headdress-makers"), Nebj ("protector's city"), Abet-desheret ("city of the red granite jars") and Huj-setjet ("city of the Asians'), are mentioned on numerous clay seals alongside Peribsen's serekh, often preceded by the phrase "visit of the king at ...". Inscriptions on stone vessels also mention an "ini-setjet" ("tribute of the people of Sethroë"), which might indicate that Peribsen founded a cult centre for the deity Seth in the Nile Delta. This may suggest Peribsen ruled over the whole of Egypt, or, at least, that he was accepted as king across all of Egypt.

One official from Peribsen's reign, Nefer-Setekh ("Seth is beautiful"), the "wab-priest of the king", is known to Egyptologists by his stela. His name may highlight the appearance and popularity of Seth as a royal deity.

In Peribsen's tomb at Abydos, clay seals were found that demonstrate the first complete written sentence in recorded Egyptian history. The inscription reads:

"The golden one/He of Ombos hath unified/handed over the two realms for/to his son, the king of Lower and Upper Egypt, Peribsen".

The title "The golden one", also read as "He of Ombos", is considered by Egyptologists to be a religious form of address to the deity Seth.

=== Religious changes ===
Despite his alignment with Seth, numerous deities were worshipped by the populace under Peribsen. Numerous clay seal impressions and jar inscriptions mention the gods Ash, Horus, Nekhbet, Min, Bastet and Kherty. The depictions of the deities are followed by the name of the place or town where they had their principal cult center. On the Cairo stone, a statue of Ash and a fetish of Seth are credited to Peribsen, complementing the clay seal impressions. Curiously, several seal impressions show a sun disc over the Seth chimera atop the royal serekh: the ancient symbol for the god Ra. There is no archaeologic proof that the sun god Ra was part of the Egyptian pantheon at this early date; the appearance of the disc may be the first evidence of the evolving sun cult and theistic change. The sun disc appears in connection to one of the state patrons (for example, under Peribsen's predecessor Raneb the sun was connected to Horus); under Peribsen it was connected to Seth. Under king Khasekhemwy the sun finally received its own name (ra) and, at the time of throne change between Khasekhemwy and his follower Djoser, several priests and officials also connected their name to Ra.

== Tomb ==
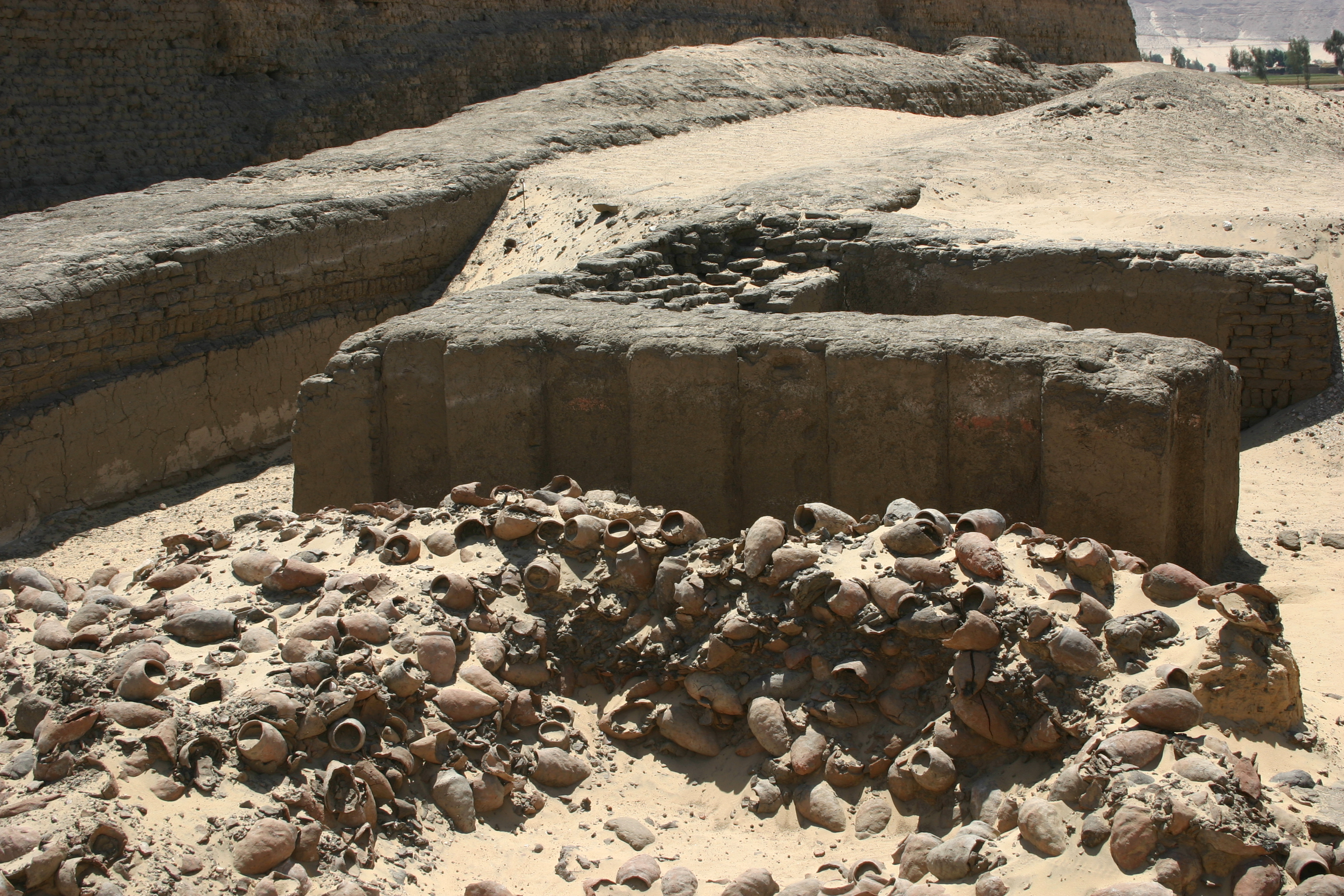
Peribsen's funerary enclosure at Abydos, in the background the Great Enclosure of king Khasekhemwy is visible

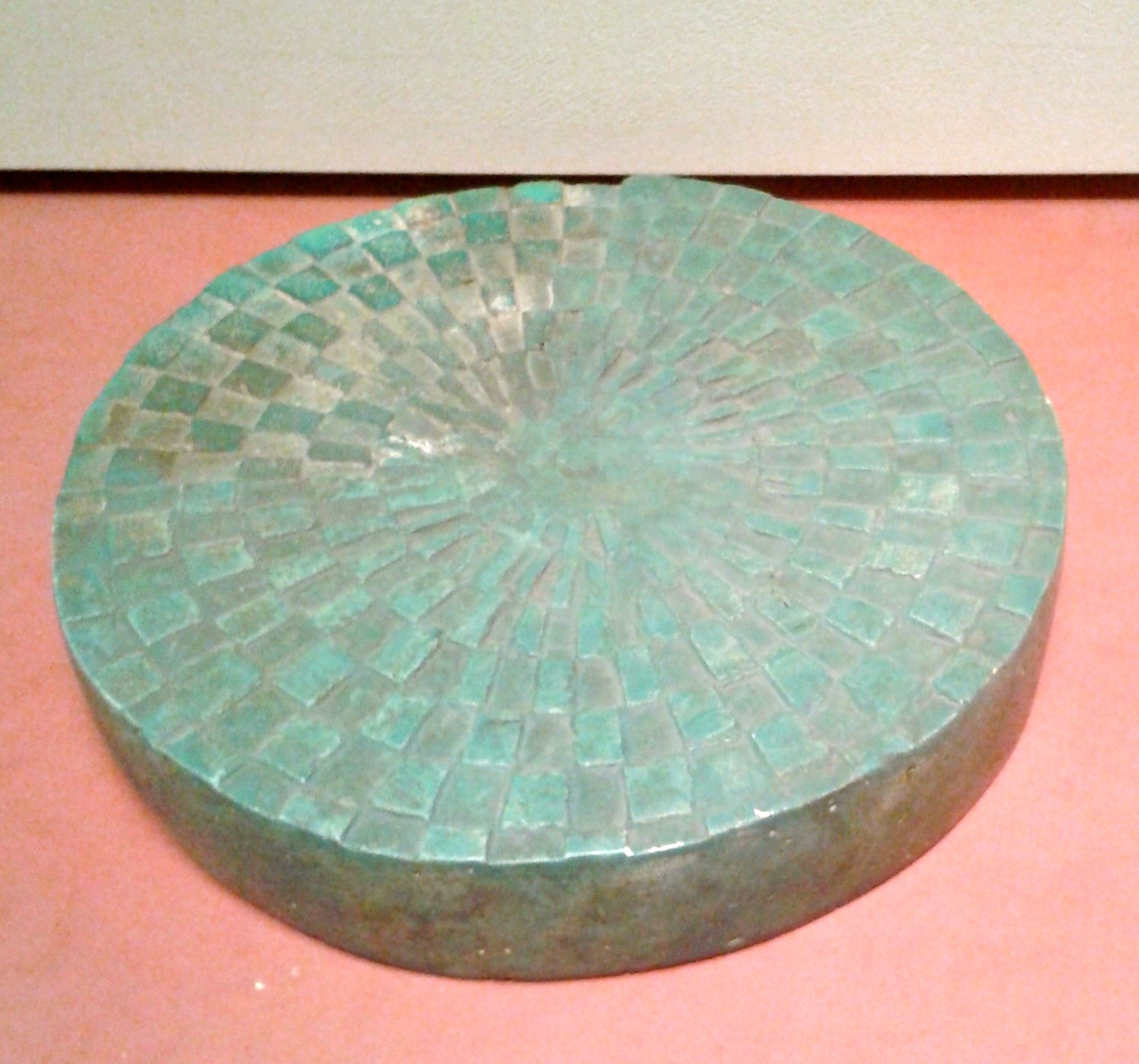
Mehen game board reconstructed from fragments discovered in Peribsen's tomb in Abydos.

Peribsen was buried in the tomb P of the royal cemetery at Umm el-Qa'ab near Abydos. The first excavation of the tomb started in 1898 under the supervision of French archaeologist and Egyptologist Émile Amélineau. This first foray was followed by excavations in 1901 and 1902 under the supervision of British archaeologist Sir William Matthew Flinders Petrie. Further exploration of the tomb was undertaken in 1911-1912 by the Swiss Egyptologist Edouard Naville.

The tomb's construction is straightforward and, compared to the size of other royal tombs in the same area, surprisingly small. The design model was the tomb of king Djer (third pharaoh of the First dynasty), thought to be the 'Tomb of Osiris' from the Middle Kingdom. The architecture of Peribsen's tomb is similar to the residential palace. The tomb measures 16 metres (52 ft) x 13 metres (43 ft) and comprises three independent structures nested into one another: in the center is the main burial chamber, measuring 7.3 metres (24 ft) x 2.9 metres (9.5 ft), and which is made of mud bricks, reeds, and wood. On the north, east and west sides the burial chamber is surrounded by nine small storage rooms leading into one another; on the south face is a long antechamber. A passageway runs between the inner structures and the outer wall.

Excavations under the supervision of the Deutsches Archäologisches Institut Kairo (DAIK) in 2001 and 2004 revealed that the tomb had been erected and completed in a great hurry. The building works took place in a single phase; the walls were plastered roughly; and the monument had collapsed several times over the centuries. During the Middle Kingdom, Peribsen's tomb was restored at least twice together with the tomb of Djer, which was thought to be that of Osiris. The final report on the excavations was published in 2020.

=== Findings ===
The tomb had been extensively plundered by tomb robbers during antiquity, yet numerous stone vessels and earthen jars remained. Some of the stone vessels had copper-coated rims and are similar to the better known finds from tomb of Khasekhemwy. Vessels from preceding rulers such as Nynetjer and Raneb were also found. Beads and bracelets made of fayence and carnelian and tools made of copper were excavated. Special findings include a silver needle engraved with the name of king Hor Aha and clay seal fragments with the name of king Sekhemib. The two stone stelae from the entrance, common to burial chambers of the First and Second dynasties, are now on display in two different museums.

=== Royal funerary enclosure ===
A royal funerary enclosure made of mud bricks was found close to Peribsen's tomb. Clay seals with Peribsen's serekh name on them were located near the eastern entrance and inside a destroyed offering shrine. The findings support the view that the building was part of Peribsen's burial site. The funerary enclosure is commonly known as "Middle Fort". This was first discovered in 1904 under the supervision of Canadian archaeologist Charles Trick Currelly and British Egyptologist Edward Russell Ayrton. The enclosure wall was located on the north-west side of Khasekhemwy's funerary enclosure "Shunet El Zebib" ("raisin barn"). Peribsen's measures 108 metres (354 ft) x 55 metres (180 ft) and housed only a few cult buildings. The enclosure has three entrances: one to the east, one to the south and one to the north. A small shrine, measuring 12.3 metres (40 ft) x 9.75 metres (32.0 ft) was located at the south-east corner of the funerary enclosure. It once comprised three small chapels. No subsidiary tombs were found.

The tradition of burying the family and court of the king when he died was abandoned at the time of Qa'a, one of the last rulers of the First dynasty.

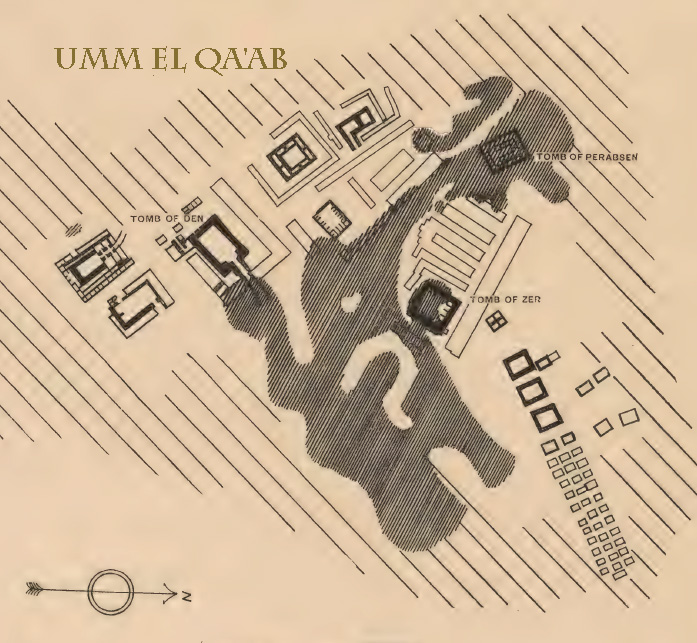
Map of Umm e-Qaab cemetery

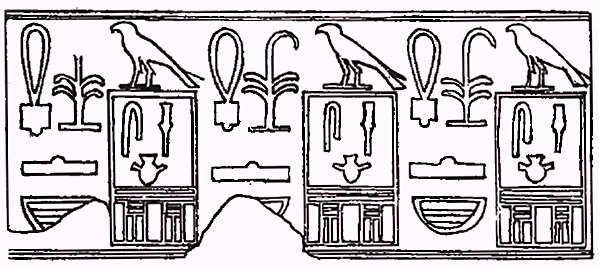
Serekh Per-ib-sen, seal Umm el-Qa’ab tomb (P)

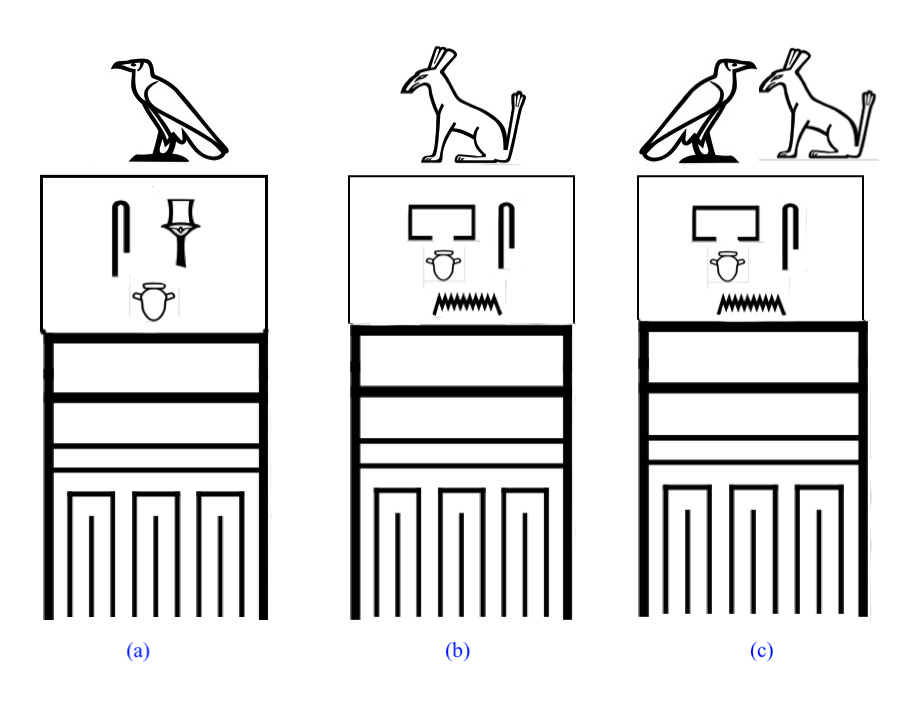
Peribsen variants of the serkh: (a) Horus serkh - Per-ib-sen, (b) Sekhem-ab Peribsen, (c) Horus - Set Per-ib-sen

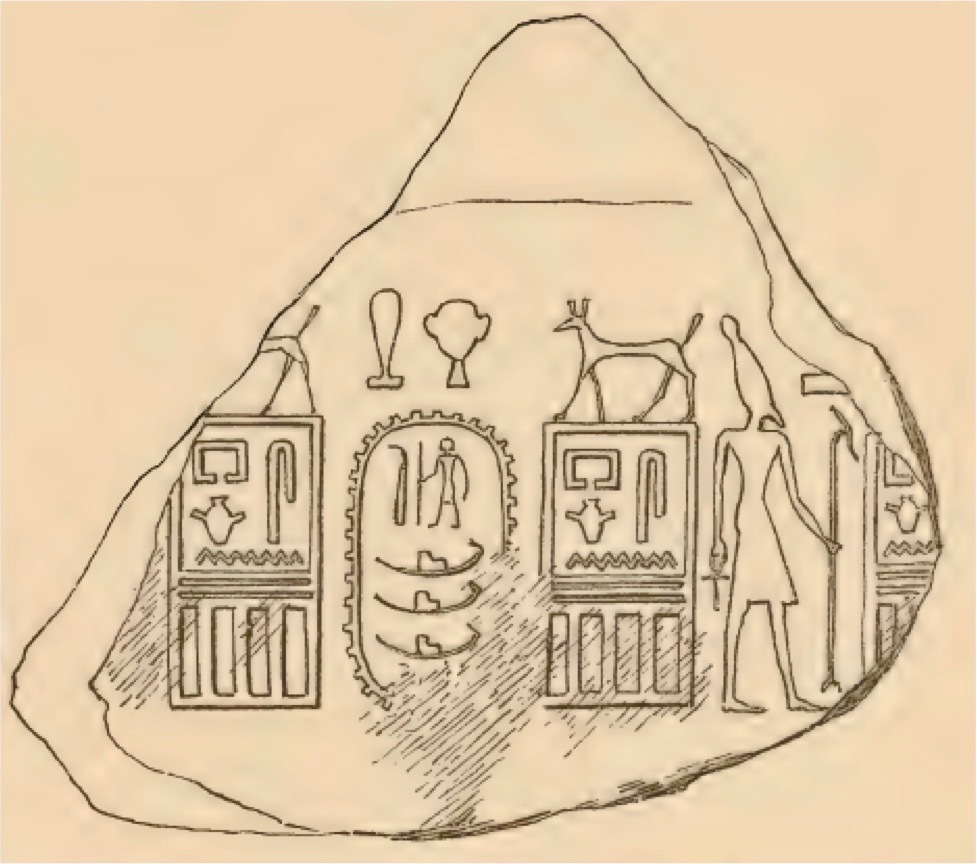
Clay seal from the tomb (P) Umm el-Qaab Sekhem-ab Peribsen

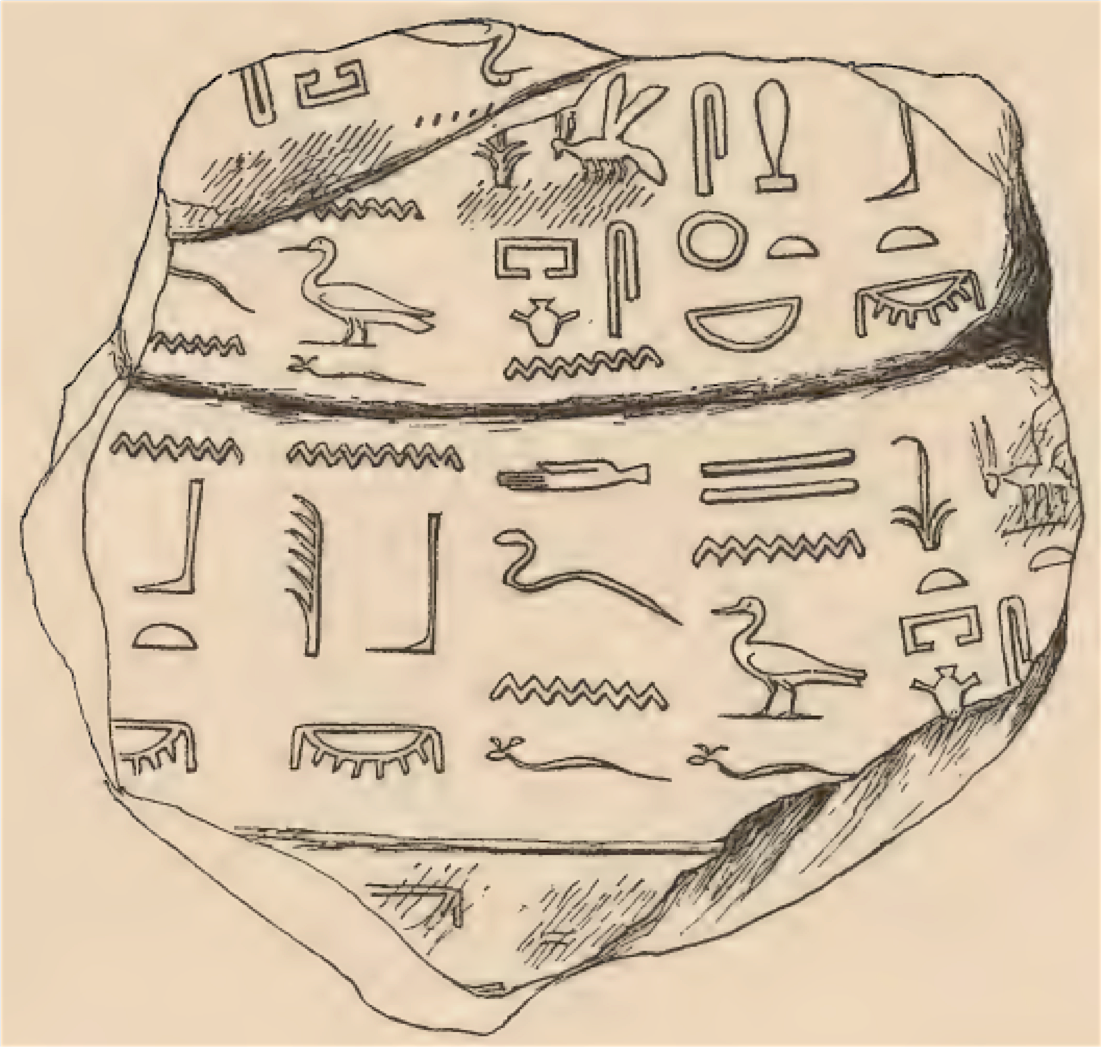
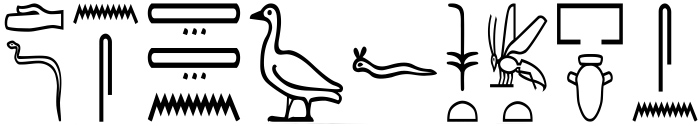
Seal from the tomb at Umm el-Káb script
’’He joined the two lands for his son, the king of Upper and Lower Egypt, Perabsen.’
