= Setjet =

Egyptian first Dynasty Rebellion war

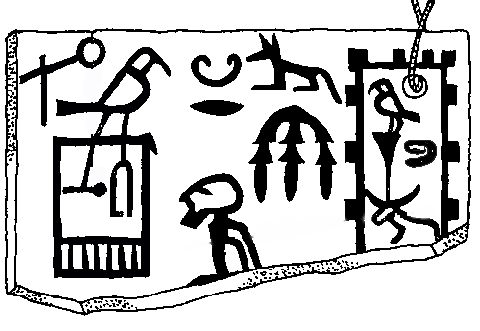
Ivory label bearing the serekh of Pharaoh Hor-Aha. It reports the victory over the "arch-using Setjet-folks" (center) and the visit at the domain "Horus thrives with the cattles" (right).

The Setjet (Egyptian: Sṯt) were a people in conflict with the early Egyptian rulers of the First Dynasty of Egypt. One of the year labels of Pharaoh Djer mentions the "smiting (the land of) Setjet". Setjet was presumably a region to the northeast, or a region of Western Asia.

Seth-Peribsen of the Second Dynasty of Egypt is also mentioned as a conqueror of Setjet, which might have been in this case the city of Sethroë (Heracleopolis Parva).
