= Shepset-ipet =

Shepset-ipet in hieroglyphs
Personal name:
A50 O46 M17 p t
Shepset-ipet
Špṣ.t-ip(w)t
Lady of the harem

Shepset-ipet (also read as Shepsetipet and Shepset-ipwt) was an ancient Egyptian princess living during the late 2nd Dynasty. She may have been the daughter of king (pharaoh) Peribsen or Khasekhemwy. She is known by her decorated slab stela.

== Identity ==
Shepset-ipet may have been the daughter of either Peribsen or (more likely) Khasekhemwy. The artistic layout and the body proportions represented on her slab stela were common during the late 2nd Dynasty. During this era, slab stelas depicting the deceased sitting before an offering table became very popular and they were displayed in special niches inside the burial chamber.

=== Titles ===
As a princess, Shepset-ipet bore several elite and pious titularies:

- Daughter of the king (Egyptian: Sat-nesw).
- Sister of the mayor (Egyptian: Khebed-hatia).

=== Attestations ===
Next to nothing is known about Shepset-ipet's career, except for her titles. She is attested by several earthen jars labelled with black ink and by her slab stela. All things were found in her mastaba tomb at Saqqara.

Her slab stela was found by Walter Bryan Emery at the entrance of mastaba S-3477 in 1902. It is made of fine polished limestone. Shepset-ipet is depicted as a seated woman, she wears a finely curled hair fashion ending in long, delicate dreadlocks. She is dressed in a tight gown which is knotted together above her left shoulder, the knot is made of a lanyard in shape of the Tijt-knot. The lady also wears a delicate pearl necklace. Shepset-ipet looks to the right and reaches out for some sort of bread or cake on an offering table. The right half of the stela is decorated with the common arrangement of offering foods. The spot where Shepset-ipet's name was encarved shows traces of revisions, thus the stela was possibly once created for another person.

== Tomb ==
Shepset-ipet's tomb was -with some certainty- mastaba tomb S-3477 at Saqqara. The tomb is heavily damaged and most of the interior has collapsed. The burial chamber is thought to be the original place of display for the slab stela, as it was usual for the second dynasty. The remains of a sixty years old woman were also found inside the tomb. She had apparently suffered from a badly deformed jaw.
