= David O'Connor (Egyptologist) =

Australian Egyptologist (1938–2022)

David Bourke O'Connor
- O'Connor interviewing in 2017
- Born: 5 February 1938; Sydney, Australia
- Died: 1 October 2022 (aged 84)
- Title: Professor emeritus

Academic background
- Education: University of Sydney (Bachelor of Arts, 1959); University College London (Diploma in Egyptology, 1962); University of Cambridge (Ph.D., 1969)

Academic work
- Discipline: Egyptology
- Institutions: University of Pennsylvania (1964–1995); New York University (1995–2017)
- Notable students: Zahi Hawass
- Website: https://isaw.nyu.edu/people/affiliates/senior-fellows/david-oconnor

David Bourke O'Connor (5 February 1938 – 1 October 2022) was an Australian-American Egyptologist who primarily worked in the fields of Ancient Egypt and Nubia.

O'Connor was the Lila Acheson Wallace Professor Emeritus at New York University's Institute of Fine Art, the Curator Emeritus of the University of Pennsylvania's Egyptian Museum, and the director emeritus of the Abydos Archaeology expedition in Egypt.

O'Connor was best known for his work in the excavation of the ancient city of Abydos in Egypt beginning in 1967.

== Early life ==
Born in Sydney in 1938, O'Connor's interests in archaeology and ancient history originated when he was a child. His initial interest centered around the ancient civilization of Babylon. As a teen, O'Connor built a replica of the city of Babylon out of bricks in a field adjacent to his home, and recreated the Fall of Babylon by setting the field alight during the height of a series bush fires in New South Wales.

== Education ==
O'Connor received a Bachelor of Arts in archaeology from the University of Sydney in 1959. While completing his bachelor's degree he focused on the ancient history of Cyprus, with a broader interest in the ancient history of the Near East. The University of Sydney did not have a specialised department of Near East studies, so O'Connor moved to the United Kingdom to continue his education. He received a Diploma in Egyptology from University College London in 1962.

At University College London O'Connor engaged in his first fieldwork. He spent three seasons in Sudan, working as part of the Nubian Salvage Campaign. In Sudan he worked under Walter B. Emery. Emery had notably discovered the Buhen Horse in the same area in 1959, the earliest example of a horse to be discovered at an Ancient Egyptian site. As a result of their excavations in Sudan, Emery and O'Connor published works on an Old Kingdom era town and Middle Kingdom era fortress at Buhen. While working in Sudan O'Connor developed his academic focus on the differences and interactions between Ancient Near Eastern civilizations. This area of study was the focus of O'Connor's most notable publication, Ancient Nubia: Egypt's Rival in Africa.

O'Connor received his PhD from the University of Cambridge in 1969.

== Career ==
=== University of Pennsylvania ===
Between 1964 and 1995 O'Connor was a professor of Ancient Egyptian History and Archaeology in the Department of Oriental Studies at the University of Pennsylvania, as well as Curator-in-Charge of the Egyptian collection at the Penn Museum. O'Connor had a dual role at the institution, working as a lecturer and mentor to PhD students at the university, as well as exhibiting and maintaining the Ancient Egyptian collection at the Museum.

O'Connor claims to have always preferred education through the use of artefacts, having previously been particularly interested in the student-accessible collections at the University of Sydney and University College London. He utilised the large collection of Ancient Egyptian artefacts to aid in tutoring post-graduate students.

O'Connor expanded his use of the Museum's collection through a series of touring exhibitions. He began with an exhibition of artefacts from Abydos, using a mixture of the Museum's collection as well as new material distributed by the Egyptian Government. The most well-travelled exhibition was of Nubian artefacts, displaying a selection of the Museum's collection at eight cities in the United States, including New York. In an oral history where he recounted his career, O'Connor stated that while he enjoyed his time curating exhibitions, it was not well respected by peers within his discipline, and it did little to progress his career. This attitude of contributing to popular history sometimes at the expense of participating in more scholarly activity, such as lecturing, writing, and fieldwork, is further shown in O'Connor's appearance in documentaries about Ancient Egypt, like PBS's Egypt's Golden Empire in 2001.

The main sites O'Connor worked at during this period were Abydos and Malkata. Abydos was an important place of worship for Ancient Egyptians to the god Osiris during the Middle Kingdom era to the Late Period. O'Connor's work at Abydos began in 1967 as part of a joint Penn-Yale Expedition, and he continued to be involved in study of the site.

O'Connor was temporarily excluded from work at Abydos as a result of the 1973 Yom Kippur War. The Israeli occupation of the Sinai Peninsula and threat of further conflict in Egypt led Egyptian President, Anwar Sadat, to evacuate foreign tourists from Egypt and consolidate foreign archaeologists in a few central locations. O'Connor was relocated to the urban site of Malkata, near Thebes, studying the artificial lake of the Malkata Palace as well as a collection of ancient ceramics. O'Connor co-directed this project with his former University of Cambridge peer, Barry Kemp.

O'Connor's most notable student from his time at the University of Pennsylvania was archaeologist and former Egyptian Minister of Antiquities, Zahi Hawass. O'Connor first met Hawass when the former was excavating at Malkata in 1974, and the latter was working as an inspector of antiquities for the Egyptian Government. They reunited at the Abydos dig-site in 1979, where Hawass's interest in Egyptology prompted O'Connor and co-director, William Kelly Simpson, to invite him to the United States to view museum collections. Hawass began his doctoral work at the University of Pennsylvania as a Fulbright Scholar in 1980, with O'Connor acting as an advisor to Hawass's dissertation.

Having left the institution in 1995, O'Connor held the role of Curator Emeritus of the University of Pennsylvania's Egyptian Museum.

=== New York University ===
From 1995 to 2017 O'Connor worked at the Institute of Fine Arts of New York University as the Lila Acheson Wallace Professor of Ancient Egyptian Art. Here O'Connor continued his fieldwork at Abydos and role as a teacher of tertiary-level students. O'Connor also continued to publish works on his findings at Abydos as well as in the fields of Ancient Egyptian Art and the foreign relations of Ancient Egypt with other civilizations.

O'Connor also expanded his academic role at the Institute of Fine Arts, beginning work in the field of Art History. He was not formally educated in this discipline, but had always incorporated it into his Egyptological work, such as in his study of ceramics at Malkata. This transition supported the Institute of Fine Arts' aim to diversify archaeological focuses among their faculty.

Retired since 2017, O'Connor held the title of Lila Acheson Wallace Professor Emeritus at New York University until his death in 2022.

=== Abydos ===
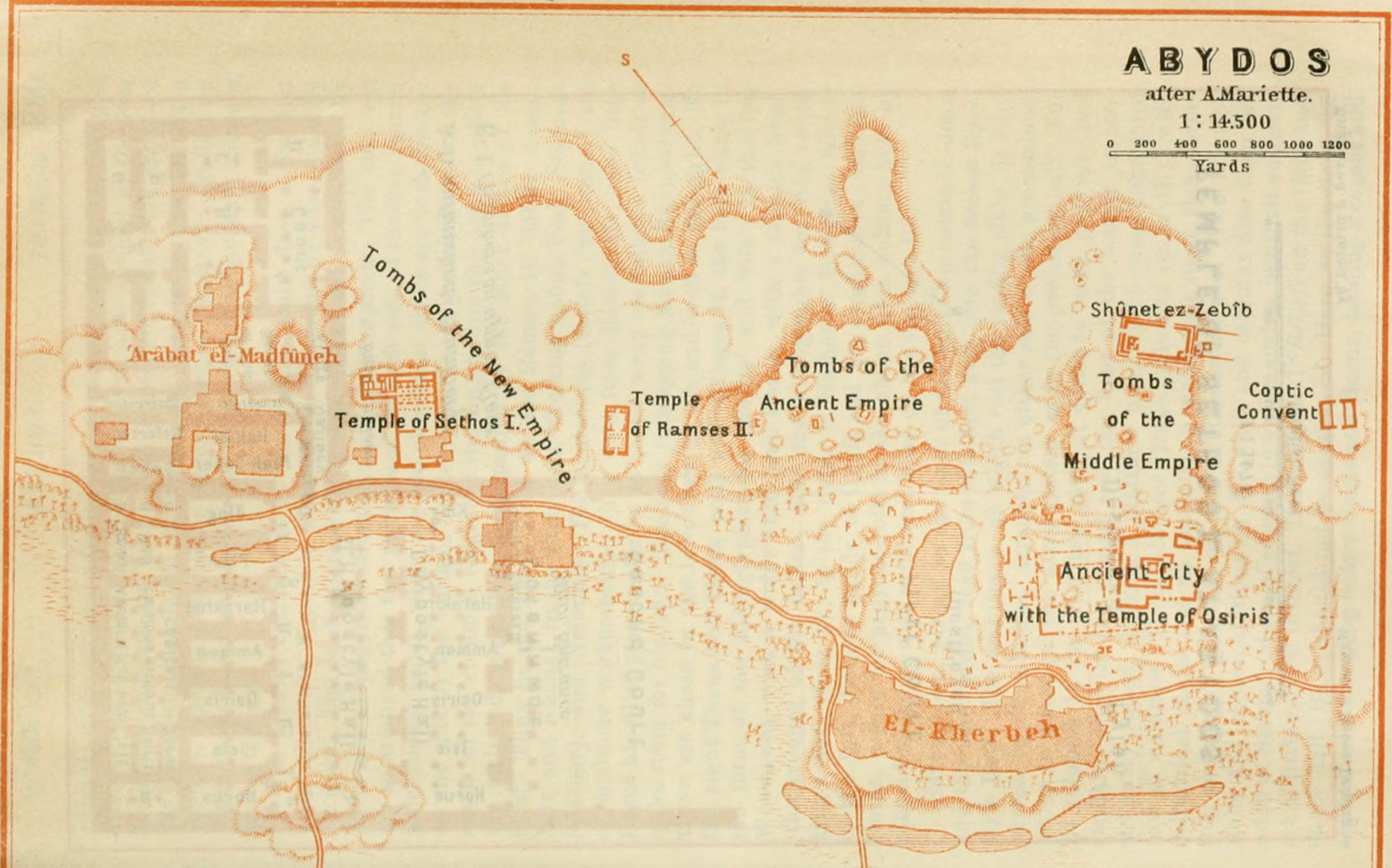
An annotated, hand-drawn map of the Abydos site from 1914

O'Connor began work at the Abydos archaeological site in 1967. The first excavations occurred at Abydos in the mid-19th century under the direction of Auguste Mariette. More systematic work began near the end of the century, undertaken by archaeologists Émile Amélineau and Sir Flinders Petrie. Abydos was historically a site for worship of the jackal god Khenti-Amentiu in the Old Kingdom era before it transitioned to the main site of worship of the god Osiris during the Fifth Dynasty. Osiris was a god of the netherworld who decided which souls could enter, and which could not. A symbol of rebirth, it was believed Osiris sacrificed himself so that the banks of the Nile could flood and water the crops that grew along it. Due to these beliefs, Osiris was worshipped by Ancient Egyptians as a god of fertility. O'Connor's work at Abydos focused on unearthing sites connected to the worship of Osiris. These buildings most often took the form of chapels, where bodies and inscriptions of names were kept, so spirits could witness yearly festivities at the Temple of Osiris.

O'Connor excavated and researched a variety of chapels in various sites, mainly in North Abydos. His work involved distinguishing between tomb chapels, like those of pharaohs such as Senwosret III, Ahmose II and Tetishri in the North Cemetery, and lesser mahat chapels of the Middle Kingdom era.

Some of O'Connor's notable work at Abydos includes:

- Locating the 'Terrace of the God', referenced in Egyptian texts, as a collection of chapels in the North Cemetery.
- Suggestion that many structures discovered damaged in the North Cemetery were intentionally demolished after a short period of use as part of ritual celebration (with the notable exception of the funerary complex of Khasekhemwy).
- A theory that Nebhepetre made cult offerings to Osiris as evidenced by the location of an offering table at a chapel at Umm el-Qa'ab.
- A theory that the tomb of Djer once had a brick chapel attached to it which has since been lost.

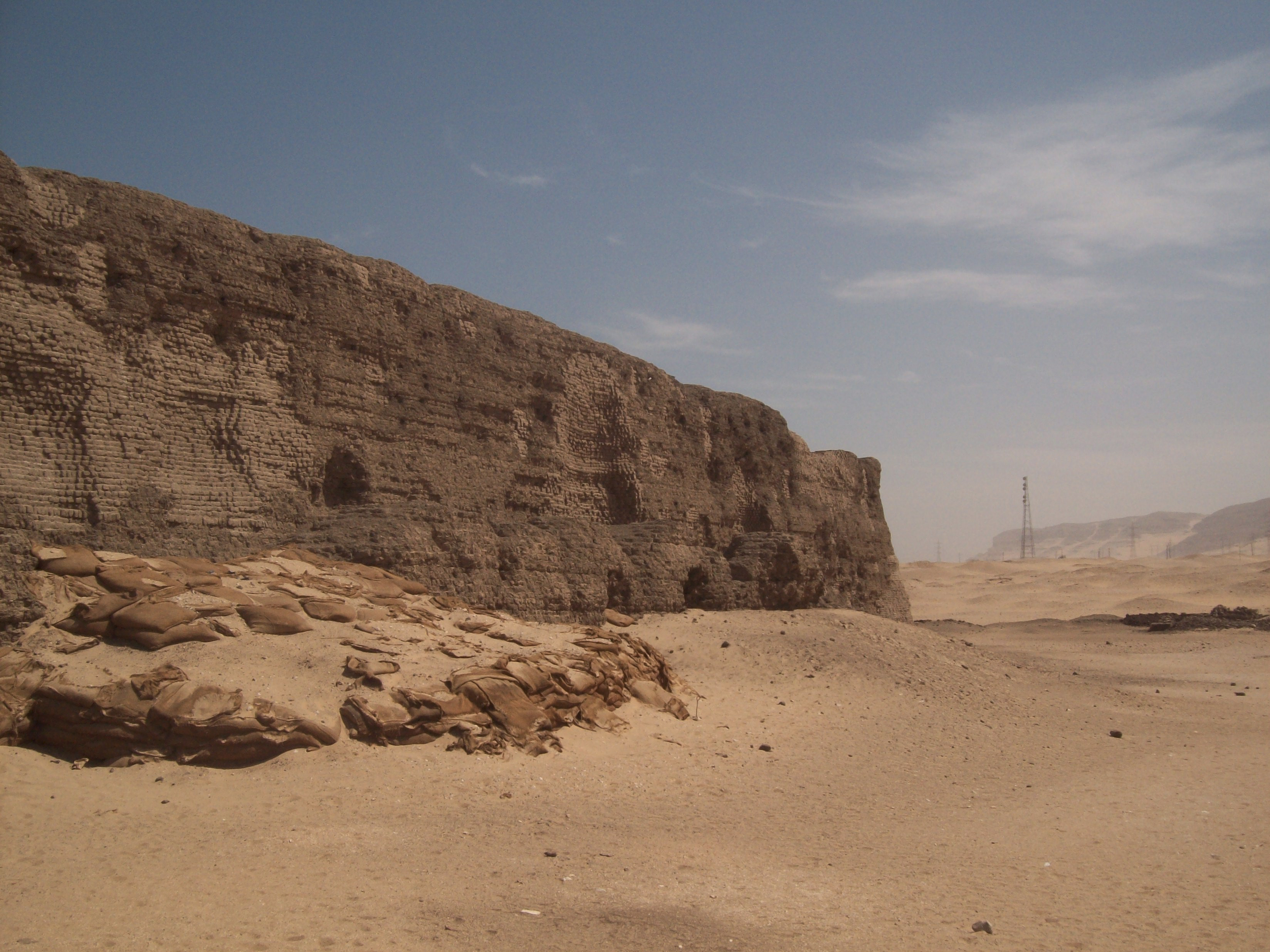
Khasekhemwy's funerary complex, Shunet el-Zebib

O'Connor also led a successful conservation project at the Abydos site. Khasekhemwy of the Second Dynasty was the last early Egyptian king to have been buried at Abydos, and his funerary monument, Shunet el-Zebib, is the last standing monument of its kind in the area. With walls reaching 12 metres tall in some parts of the complex, Shunet el-Zebib is one of the oldest mud brick buildings in the world, but, over more than 4,000 years it has collapsed in some places and is at risk of further destruction as a rising water table, wind, rain erosion, and animals digging into it for burrows have compromised its stability. From 2008 to 2009 O'Connor led a project to keep the structure standing. This conservation work focused on supporting the current structure through the sealing of animal burrows (mostly those of hornets and foxes), and reinforcing structurally unstable walls through the fabrication and use of 150,000 mud bricks, made and put in place by local workers. Support for the project was provided by O'Connor's employer at the time, New York University's Institute of Fine Arts, as well as the World Monuments Fund and the Egyptian Supreme Council of Antiquities. Additional financing for the project was provided through the American Research Center in Egypt's EAP, EAC and AEF grants, which were funded by the USAID program. O'Connor no longer worked on site at Abydos but he remained the director emeritus of the Abydos Archaeology Project.

== Death ==
O'Connor died on 1 October 2022, aged 84.

== American Research Center in Egypt ==
The American Research Center in Egypt (ARCE) acts as a base for American academics in Egypt and supports their research through the provision of grants and field schools. The centre is a non-profit organization that has aided American academics since 1948. O'Connor was affiliated with ARCE since he first began working in Egypt. O'Connor was involved in the running of ARCE, as its president from 1987 to 1990, and as a member of its Board of Governors from 2009 to 2015.

== Fellowships and honours ==
- Raymond and Beverley Sackler Foundation Distinguished Lecturer in Egyptology, 1994
- William Fox Albright Lecturer, 1993

O'Connor was the yearly keynote speaker at the British Museum's lecture on Ancient Egypt and Nubia. His talk was on his team's findings at the Abydos site, specifically focusing on the importance of the city to the celebration of Osiris.

- Guggenheim Fellowship, 1982–1983

The Guggenheim Memorial Foundation offers fellowships to scholars in all fields to allow them to more easily engage in their research and scholarship, providing aid.

- Taiwan Medal of Merit, 1985
- Corresponding Member of the German Archaeological Institute in Cairo, 1995 to present

== Selected works ==
=== Authored ===
- Ancient Egypt: A Social History, co-author, 1983.
- Ancient Nubia: Egypt's Rival in Africa, 1994.
- Society and Individual in Early Egypt, in, Order, Legitimacy, and Wealth in Ancient States, 2000.
- Abydos: Egypt's First Pharaohs and the Cult of Osiris, 2011.
- The Old Kingdom Town at Buhen, 2014.

=== Edited ===
- Ancient Egyptian Kingship: New Investigations, co-editor, 1994.
- Amenhotep III. Perspectives on His Reign, co-editor, 1998.
- Encounters With Ancient Egypt, co-editor, 2003.
- Thutmose III: A New Biography, co-editor with Eric H. Cline, 2006.
- Ramesses III: The Life and Times of Egypt's Last Hero, co-editor, 2012.

=== Article ===
- The Narmer Palette: A New Interpretation (pp.145-152) in Emily Teeter (editor) https://isac.uchicago.edu/sites/default/files/uploads/shared/docs/oimp33.pdf Before the Pyramids: The Origins of Egyptian Civilization] The Oriental Institute of the Museum of Chicago 33, 2011 PDF

== See also ==
- List of Egyptologists
