= Shery (Egypt) =

- Great of the Ten of Upper Egypt; Overseer of the wab-priests of Peribsen in the necropolis of Senedj
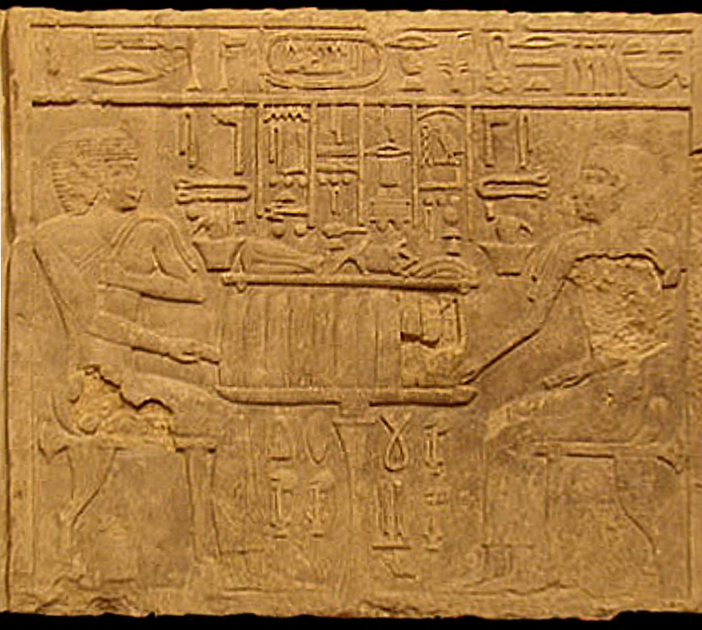
- Scene from the false door of Shery's mastaba (Ashmolean Museum, Oxford)
- Spouse: Khentetek; Inet (?)
- Mother: Inet (?)

Shery (or Sheri) is the name of an ancient Egyptian official who lived in the Old Kingdom, in the Fourth Dynasty.

== Sources ==
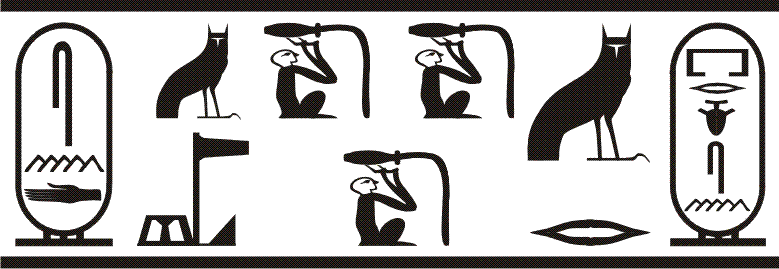
Inscription from the false door from the tomb of the high priest Shery at Saqqara.

Shery is known from his mastaba at Saqqara that was found and partly recorded in the nineteenth century AD. His wife was called Khentetek; a second woman appearing in his tomb decoration was called Inet and may have been a second wife (or mother?). Shery held the title “Overseer of all wab-priests of king Peribsen in the necropolis of king Senedj”, “Great One of the Ten of Upper Egypt” and “God´s Servant of Senedj”. Senedj´s name is written in archaic form and set in a cartouche, which is an anachronism, since the cartouche itself was not yet used until the end of 3rd Dynasty under king Huni. As the latter king is little known, the titles given to Shery are of special importance. The inscription for Shery suggests to Egyptologists, such as Wolfgang Helck, that Peribsen died during the reign of Senedj and that the relationship between the two kings was a peaceful one.

== Literature ==
- Michael Rice: Who is who in ancient Egypt. Routledge, London 1999, ISBN 0-415-15448-0, page 181 and 190.
- Nicolas Christophe Grimal: A history of ancient Egypt. Wiley-Blackwell, Weinheim 1994, ISBN 0-631-19396-0, page 55.
- Wolfgang Helck: Untersuchungen zur Thinitenzeit, Band 45. Harrassowitz, Wiesbaden 1987, ISBN 3-447-02677-4, page 105 - 107
