= Nefer-Setekh =

Egyptian high official

- Wab-priest of the king
Egyptian name
E21 N37 F35 D21 Nfr.stx
Seth is merciful

Nefer-Setekh (also written Nefersetekh) is the name of an ancient Egyptian high official, who lived and worked either during the late midst of the 2nd or during the beginning of the 3rd dynasty. He became known by his name, which was addressed to the deity Seth.

== Attestations ==
Nefer-Setekh is known by his damaged tomb stele found at Helwan. This stela depicts Nefer-Setekh as a deceased sitting in front of an offering table, dressed in a very tight gown. He looks to the right, his name and title are carved in directly above his head. At the right side of the offering table the stele depicts and describes sacrificial food such as poultry, onions, lettuce and bread. Furthermore, the stela contains a list in tabular form, it provides the enumeration and description of precious clothes and fabrics such as canvas and yarn. The list also contains the enumeration and description of several sorts of fragrance oil and incense.

== Identity ==
Nefer-Setekh's only preserved bureaucratic title is that of an "wab-priest of the king". Details about his family are unknown.

Nefer-Setekh's name means "Seth is merciful", since the hieroglyphic sign for Nefer (Gardiner sign F35) means "kindly" or "merciful" when connected to a certain deity. The name is of special interest for Egyptologists and Historians as well, because it is directly addressed to the deity Seth. This leads Egyptologists such as Toby Wilkinson and Christiana Köhler to a datation of Nefer-Setekh's lifetime into the late midst of the 2nd dynasty, when the deity Seth experienced special popularity. Other Egyptologists, such as Jochem Kahl and Katrin Scheele contradict this datation. The use of slab stelas with tabular lists including the enumeration of offering items is not archaeologically attested until the beginning of the 3rd dynasty and special signs for numbers such as used in Nefer-Setekh's stela were also not in use before that time.
