= Shunet El Zebib =

Archaeological site in Egypt

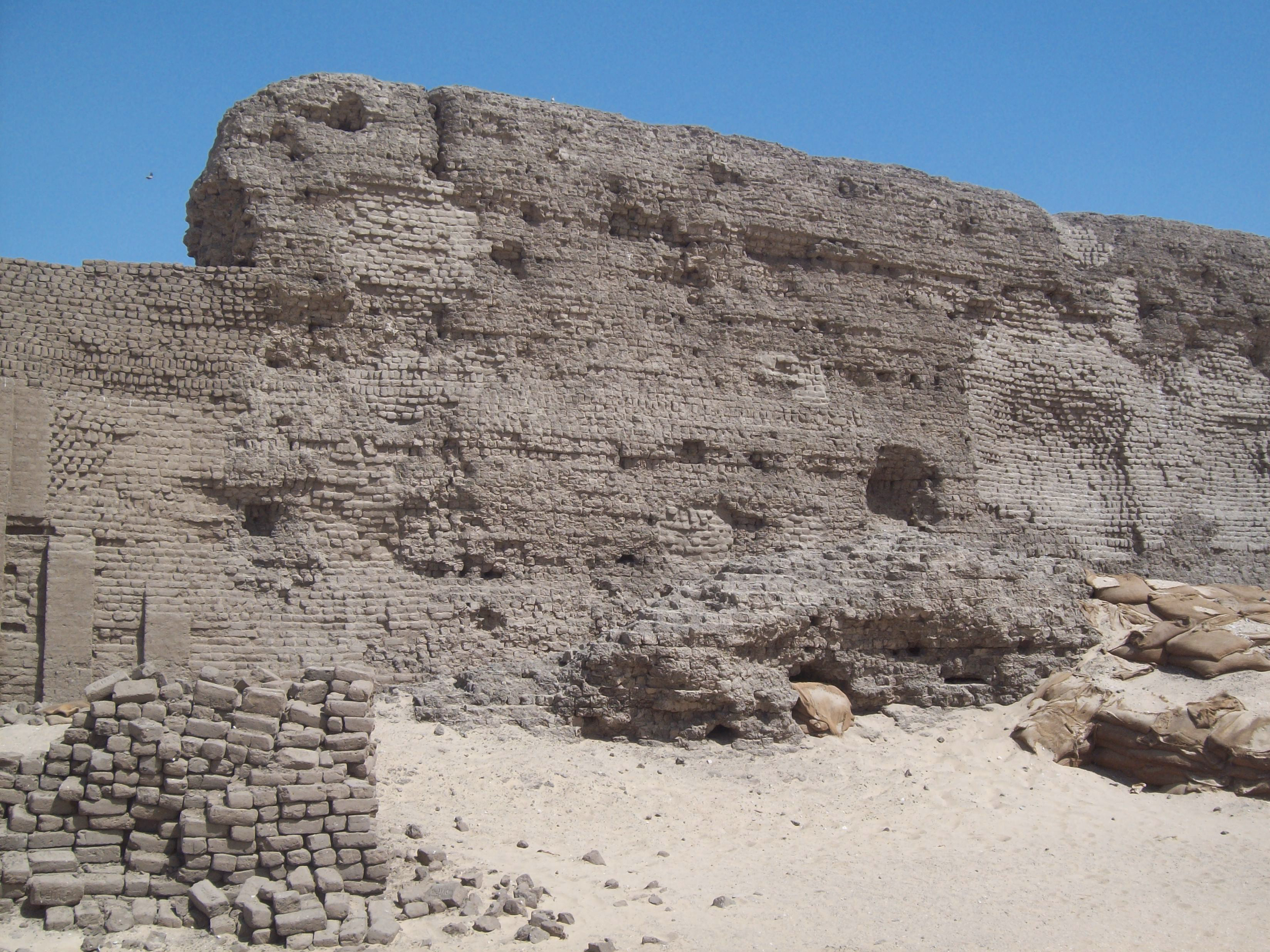
- South-eastern wall of the Shunet El Zebib
- Interactive map of Shunet El Zebib
- 26°11′22″N 31°54′28″E
- Type: Wall
- Location: Sohag, Egypt

History
- Built: c. 2700 BC

Site notes
- Material: Mudbrick
- Height: 12 m (39 ft)

Shunet El Zebib (Arabic:شونة الزبيب lit. "raisin barn" or "storage of the raisins"), alternatively named Shuneh and Middle Fort, is a large mudbrick structure located at Abydos in Upper Egypt. The edifice dates to the Second Dynasty, and was built by the ancient Egyptian king Khasekhemwy.

== Description ==
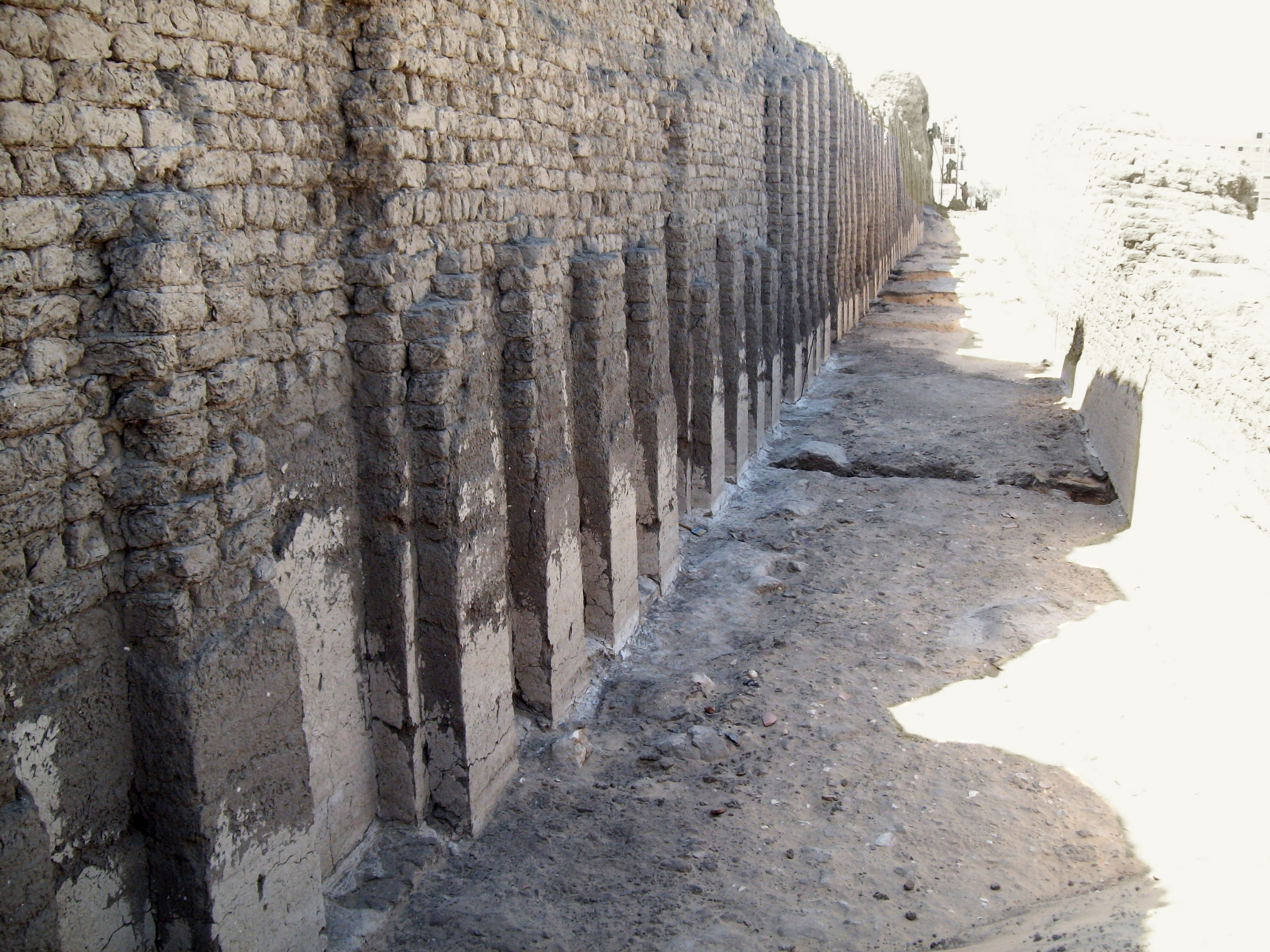
North-eastern wall with well preserved niches

Shunet El Zebib is made of hardened mudbricks. It consists of two rectangular surrounding walls, interlaced like a shoe box. The outer wall measures 137 × 77 m and is c. 5 m thick and 12 m high. The inner wall (perimeter wall) measures 123 × 56 m and is c. 3 m thick and 8 m high. The facade of the outer wall was niched, imitating a royal palace facade. The enclosure provides two entrances, one at the eastern corner, one at the northern corner. These entrances once consisted of massive, stone-made door jambs, the material of the door wings is unknown.

The inner area consists of a largely empty court; it is unknown if there were some substructures and/or larger buildings (such as a shrine or temple). In 1988, Australian Egyptologist David O'Connor discovered a square, flat mount made of fine limestone rubble, covered with mudbricks and forming four flat steps. It is located at the very midst of the court, its true purpose is still unknown. The only cultic building that can be archaeologically attested is a small chapel close to the south-eastern corner. Its ruins are also made of hardened mud bricks.

== History ==
Shunet El Zebib was founded around 2700 BC by the ancient Egyptian king Khasekhemwy, the last ruler of the 2nd Dynasty. The Shunet was built as a so-called funerary enclosure, a place where the deceased king was worshipped and memorized. Such a place was named "house of the Ka" or "Ka-house" by the Egyptians and it was some kind of forerunner to the later mortuary temples known from the Old Kingdom period. As usual for the Early Kingdom, abydene rulers had their own mastaba tomb with a separated funerary enclosure close by. Because Khasekhemwy and his predecessor Seth-Peribsen were buried at Abydos and had their funerary enclosures at the same location, some Egyptologists believe that both kings belonged to a royal dynasty line named Thinite Dynasty. This could indeed explain Peribsen's and Khasekhemwy's choice of place. However, it is unknown how long the mortuary enclosure of Khasekhemwy was in use, neither its Ancient Egyptian name is known. Because of its thick and interlaced walls, it was long time thought that Shunet El Zebib was a military fortress, which led to its alternative designation as "Middle Fort". But archaeological findings provide only cultic and religious activities and a location so close to cemeteries speaks rather against any military use. Khasekhemwy's enclosure domain is now evaluated as the most advanced and most massive version of a Ka-house.

== Archaeological and Egyptological importance ==
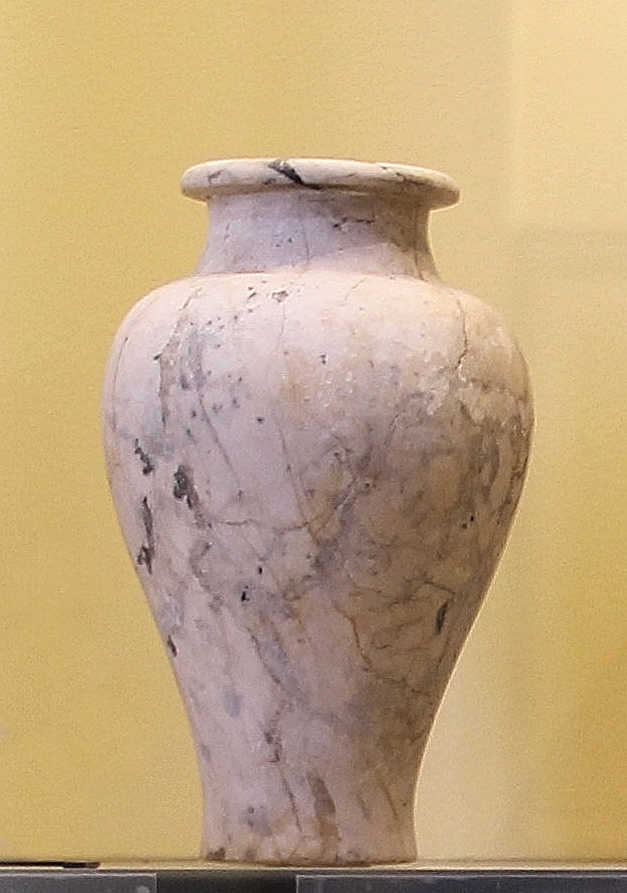
Marble vase from the tomb of Khasekhemwy. Abydos, circa 2700 BCE. Louvre Museum, E 23051

Shunet El Zebib is of great importance to archaeologists, Egyptologists, and historians alike. The Institute of Fine Arts at New York City led and promoted several preservation campaigns between 2002 and 2007, mostly focused on the enclosure walls. These are heavily damaged and at some sections in danger of collapse. Most damage comes, beside natural aging due to neglect after abandonment, from local hornets of the species Vespa orientalis. They burrow their nests into the walls, hollow out the inner bricks and thus make the walls highly unstable. Another danger to the structure are wild jackals, which attentively observe excavators' diggings and then burrow under the foundation of the structure in the hopes of catching roused prey.

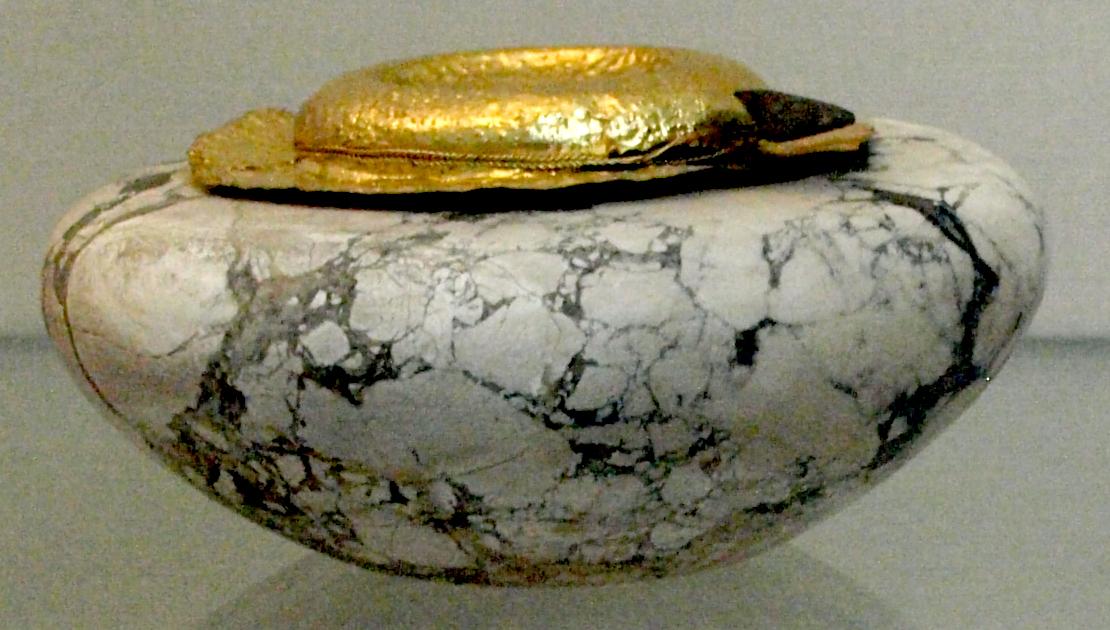
Limestone vessel with gold cover from Khasekhemwy's tomb

Under the guidance of Matthew Adams and David O'Connor, preservation works still focus on the filling of gaps and holes in the enclosure walls, approximately 250,000 new mud bricks were already created. In the meantime, the southern entrance has been reconstructed at the site.

Because of the stunning architectural similarities between Shunet El Zebib and the Pyramid complex of 3rd dynasty king Djoser, archaeologists and Egyptologists often describe the "Middle Fort" as a direct forerunner of the step pyramid complexes. The flat, stepped inner mount of the Shunet El Zebib is even considered a "proto-pyramid".
