= Kherty =

Ancient Egyptian deity

- Kherty was depicted as a mummified Ram
Name in hieroglyphs
T28 t or T28 t i G7

Kherty is an ancient Egyptian deity. Despite being archaeologically attested since the early 2nd Dynasty, his original mythological role during this era is unclear. Kherty was an Egyptian god of the Duat. The earliest mythological descriptions of Kherty's role do not appear until the 6th Dynasty in the Pyramid Texts.

== Description ==
The earliest depictions of Kherty appear during the early 2nd dynasty, under king (pharaoh) Hotepsekhemwy and Raneb. He is normally shown as a recumbent and mummified ram. In rare instances he was pictured as a bull or a lion. The figurine is always guided by the hieroglyphic signs of a shamble and a bread loaf, giving a reading as kherty.

== Cult ==
Kherty was worshipped since the early 2nd dynasty, his name appears first time on stone bowls of king Sneferka. Stone bowl inscriptions from the reign of king Peribsen mention first time the title "god servant of Kherty" (Egypt. hem-netjer Kherty). The main centre of the Kherty cult was located at Letopolis (today Ausim), a second cult centre was later founded at Nesat (exact location unknown).

== Mythology ==
Kherty was a contradicting character: The pyramid texts reveal that he was worshipped at one side as a guide, who brought the deceased king safely to "the yonder site" by "being the ferryman". He also protected the deceased against various demons (named inmetjw in the texts) sent by Seth. The deceased king was then brought to his destination by Ra. On the other site, however, Kherty was feared as death in persona, a god that "lives on the heart of men", making them stop pounding. The pyramid texts reveal that Kherty attacked the physical heart (khat(jw)) of the dying peoples, not the metaphysical, symbolic heart (jb) as the "seat of thoughts and feelings". For this reason, a lot of spells and prayers were addressed to Kherty in attempt to befriend and please him. Other prayers beg Ra to "take the deceased king away from Kherty". These prayers also mention Osiris, the judge of the underworld. Thus, Kherty and Osiris were mythologically connected to each other.

Kherty is not mentioned in the famous Coffin Texts of Middle Kingdom period. Instead, he is replaced by a god Aker, who is now the ferryman. In the prayers of the Book of the Dead, Kherty is described as a guard who guides the celestial bark of Ra.
