= Jochem Kahl =

German Egyptologist (born 1961)

- Born: 1961 (age 64–65); Ravensburg, Germany
- Education: University of Tübingen, University of Münster, University of Vienna
- Occupation: Egyptologist
- Employer: Free University of Berlin
- Organizations: German Archaeological Institute
- Known for: Excavations at Assiut, research on Egyptian hieroglyphs
- Notable work: The System of Egyptian Hieroglyphic Writing in the 0th – 3rd Dynasty, Siut - Thebes, Ancient Asyut
- Title: Professor

Jochem Kahl (born 1961) is a German Egyptologist.

A native of Ravensburg, Kahl studied undergraduate history and Greek at the University of Tübingen from 1983 to 1984 and then Egyptology, Classical Archeology and Pre- and Early History at Münster, Tübingen and Vienna between 1984 and 1990. Kahl undertook his doctorate with the study "The System of Egyptian Hieroglyphic Writing in the 0th – 3rd Dynasty" between 1992 and 1998.

From 1998 to 2004, he was a university lecturer at the Institute for Egyptology and Coptology at the University of Münster. In 2004, he was given a professorship at the University of Münster and in 2006 a professorship at University of Mainz. He is currently at Free University of Berlin.

He leads the excavations at Assiut and the surrounding area in Central Egypt and has been a professor at the Free University of Berlin since October 2008. Kahl is a member of the German Archaeological Institute.

== Selected publications ==
- The system of Egyptian hieroglyphic writing in the 0th to 3rd centuries Dynasty, Harrassowitz, Wiesbaden, 1994.
- with Nicole Kloth, Ursula Zimmermann: The Inscriptions of the 3rd Dynasty. An inventory, Harrassowitz, Wiesbaden, 1995 ISBN 3-447-03733-4 (= Egyptological Treatises, Volume 56).
- Steh auf, gib Horus deine Hand. The narrative of Altenmüller's pyramid text saying, Harrassowitz, Wiesbaden, 1996
- Siut - Thebes. To appreciate tradition in ancient Egypt, Leiden, Brill 1999
- with Eva-Maria Engel: buried, burned, misunderstood and forgotten - finds from the "Menesgrab", Münster 2001
- Searching for the Rise of the Sun God at the Dawn of Egyptian History . (= Menes, Volume 1) Harrassowitz, Wiesbaden, 2007
- Ancient Asyut. The First Synthesis after 300 Years of Research. (= The Asyut Project, Volume 1) Harrassowitz, Wiesbaden, 2007
- Die Zeit selbst lag nun tot darnieder. The city of Assiut and its necropolises according to western travel reports from the 17th to 19th centuries: construction, destruction and reconstruction. (= The Asyut Project, Volume 5) Harrassowitz, Wiesbaden 2013, ISBN 978-3-447-06867-3 .
- The Tomb of the Dogs at Asyut: Faunal Remains and Other Selected Objects. With contributions by Jochem Kahl and Günter Vittmann
- The Asyut Project: Eleventh Season of Fieldwork (2014)
- Ein wiederentdeckter Hundefriedhof in Assiut, 2010.
- The Asyut Project: six seasons of fieldwork 2009
- The Asyut Project: Fourth Season of Fieldwork (2006)
- The First Intermediate Period Tombs at Asyut Revisited
