= Mesen-ka =

Egyptian Prince alive during the late 2nd Dynasty and/or early 3rd Dynasty

- King's son
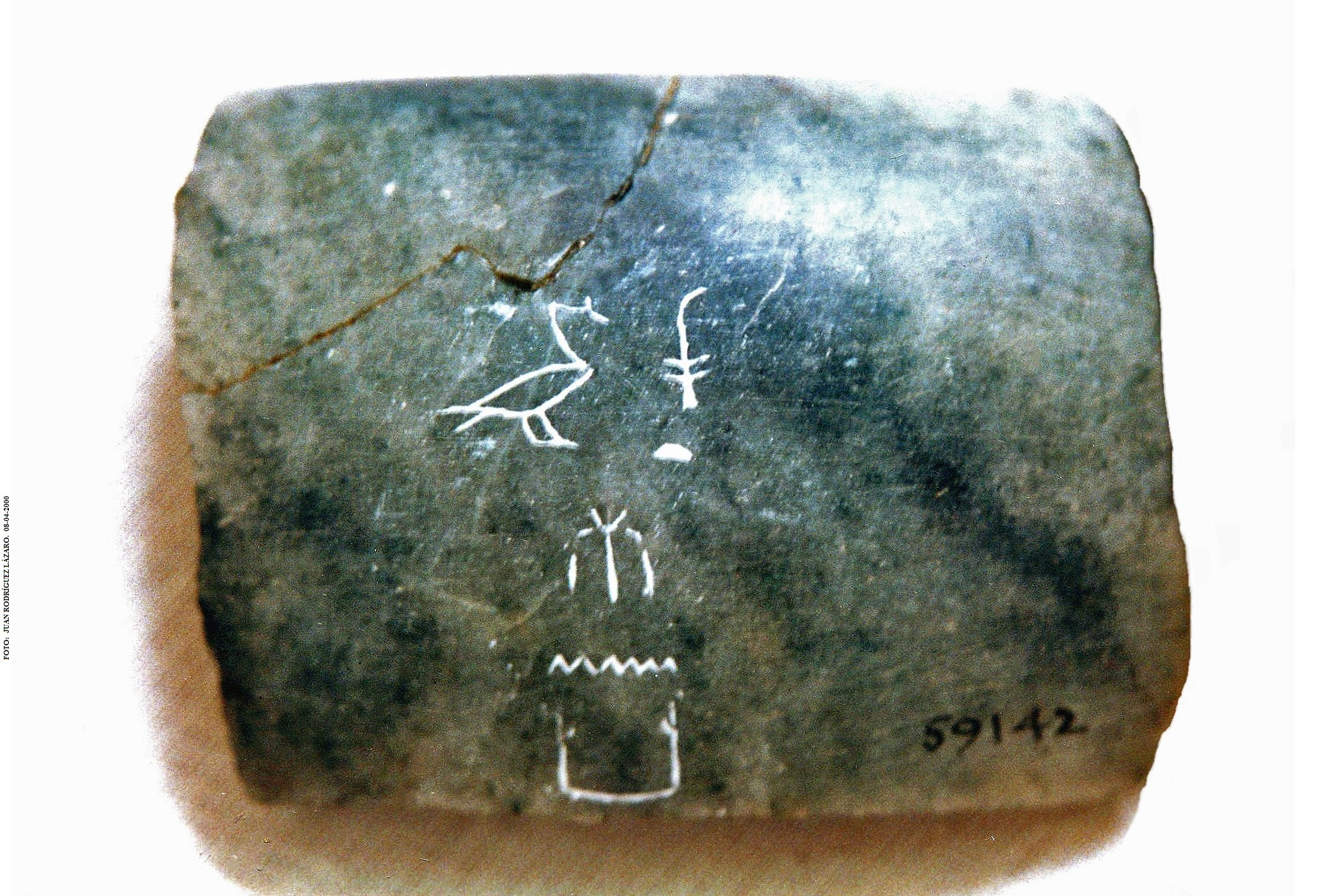
- Stone bowl fragment with name and title of Mesen-ka.
Egyptian name
F31 n D28 msn-k3
His Ka is born

Mesen-ka (also read as Mesenka) was an ancient Egyptian prince living during the late 2nd Dynasty or at the beginning of the 3rd Dynasty. It is disputed as to who was the king (pharaoh) who reigned during Mesen-ka's time of officeship.

== Identity ==
Mesen-ka is attested by two stone bowl inscriptions only. These were found in the underground storages beneath the Southern Gallery within the Pyramid of Djoser at Saqqara.

=== Titles ===
As a prince, Mesen-ka bore the princely title:

- Son of the king (Egyptian: Sa-nesw).

=== Career ===
Next to nothing is known about Mesen-ka's life and career, except for his title as a prince. It is also unknown, whose son he was, since no royal name was found. Calligraphic design and diction of the inscriptions show great resemblance to other inscriptions dating back to the time of the kings Peribsen, Khasekhemwy and Djoser. Thus, Mesen-ka may have lived and served under one of these kings.
