= Menka =

Menka may be,

- Menka language
- Orestis Menka
- Menka (queen)
