= Inetkaes =

- King's Daughter
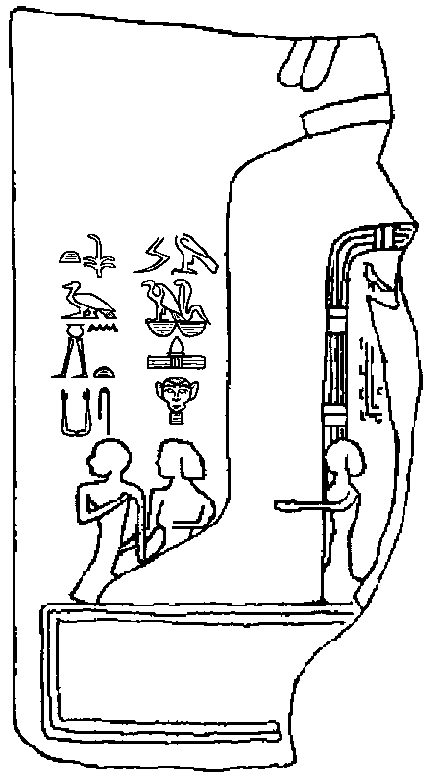
- Inetkaes (left) at the feet of her father, Djoser, next to her mother Hetephernebti (center), and a third woman whose name is lost on one of the boundary stele
- Dynasty: 3rd of Egypt
- Father: Djoser
- Mother: Hetephernebti

ini n t k s
Inetkaes
in hieroglyphs
Era: Old Kingdom
(2686–2181 BC)

Inetkaes was an ancient Egyptian princess of the Third Dynasty, who reigned during the Old Kingdom.

Inetkaes was the only known child of Pharaoh Djoser and Queen Hetephernebti, and she was a granddaughter of Khasekhemwy and Nimaethap.

She is mentioned on the boundary stelae surrounding Djoser's step pyramid (these are now to be found in various museums) and is depicted on a relief found in Heliopolis (now in Turin). This shows the enthroned pharaoh accompanied by smaller figures of Inetkaes and Hetephernebti.
