= Nimaathap =

Ancient Egyptian queen consort

- Queen consort of Egypt; Mother of a King
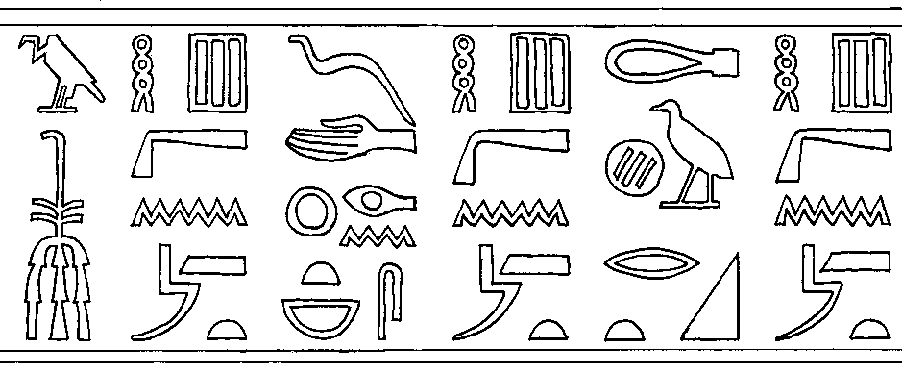
- Seal impression with the name and title of Nimaathap, found at Abydos.
- Burial: Mastaba K1 at Beit Khallaf (uncertain)
- Spouse: Khasekhemwy
- Issue: Djoser
- Dynasty: 2nd of Egypt; 3rd of Egypt

Nimaathap in hieroglyphs
Personal name:
V28 Aa5 p n U2 Aa11 X1
Nimaathap/Nimaat-Hapi
nj-m33.t-Ḥp
Maat belongs to Hapi/Apis
Royal title:
G14 M23 X1 L2 X1
Mwt neswt-bity
mw.t-nsw.t-btj
Mother of a king
Honorary title:
I10 d Aa1 X1 nb D4 n S29
Djet-khetneb-iret-nes
ḏt -ḫtnb-jr.t-ns
She who says something and it is done (for her) immediately

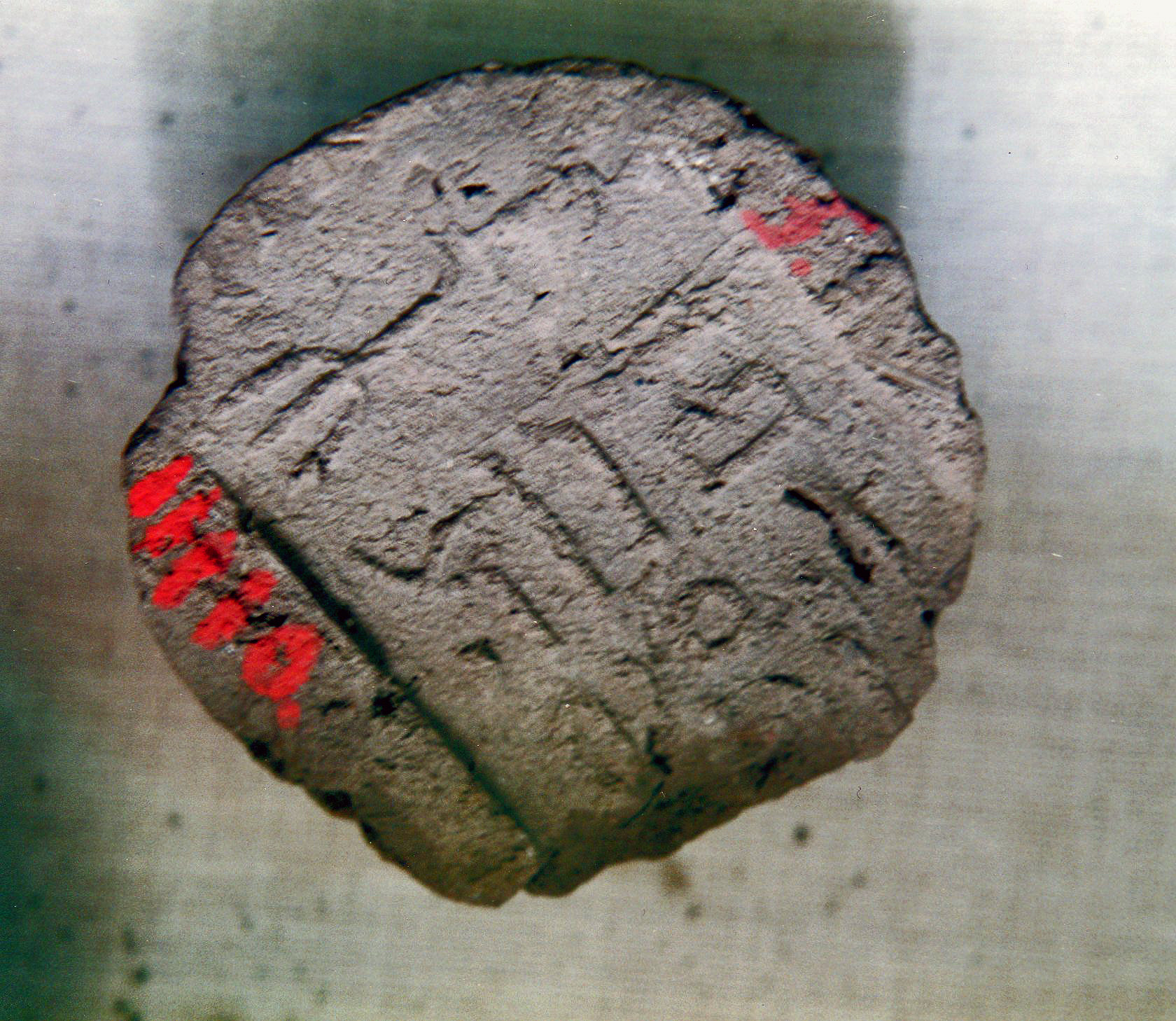
Fragment of seal impression on clay citing the "mother of the king's sons", Nymaathap. She was the mother of Djoser and wife of Khasekhemwy. Originally from Abydos, Umm el Qaab, tomb V. (Tomb of Khasekhemwy) and now in the Egyptian Museum, Cairo.

Nimaathap (also read as Nima'at-Hapi and Nihap-ma'at) was an ancient Egyptian queen consort at the transition time from 2nd Dynasty to 3rd Dynasty. Nimaathap may have acted as regent for her son Djoser.

She is known to have enjoyed a long-lasting mortuary cult.

== Attestations ==
Nimaathap's name appears on clay seal impressions discovered mostly in the tomb of king (pharaoh) Khasekhemwy, the last ruler of the 2nd dynasty. Other seals were found at Beit Khallaf at the burial sites of the mastaba tombs K1 and K2; the relationships of the original tomb owners to Nimaathap are unknown, though. Her name also appears on stone slab fragments from Heliopolis. These show Nimaathap kneeling at the feet of pharaoh Djoser, together with Djoser's wife, queen Hetephernebti and Djoser's daughter, princess Inetkaes. The relief is evaluated as proof that Nimaathap was still alive at that time and that she participated in at least one Hebsed ceremony. Nimaathap's name does not appear in the pyramid necropolis of Djoser at Saqqara; there, her name was replaced by depictions of the god of grief and mummies, Anubis.

Nimaathap's name also appears in a tomb inscription of the high official Metjen, who held office under the kings Huni and Sneferu. Metjen was "overseer of the Ka-house of Nimaethap"; thus he oversaw and administered the mortuary cult for the queen. Egyptologists take this as a proof of how famous Nimaathap must have been during the Old Kingdom period.

== Identity ==
=== Personal name ===
Nimaathap's name is also read as Nimaathapi; her name is connected to the earth god Hapi. This is similar to the name of queen Khenthap of the 1st Dynasty. In both cases some scholars believe that the connection between the queen's names and the god Apis refers to a somewhat later introduced title of the king: bull of his mother.An old reading once was Hepenmaat, because the syllable Hapi was not recognized as the name of Hapy yet.

=== Titles ===
As a queen, Nimaathap bore several elite titularies:

- Mother of a king (Egyptian: Mwt-neswt-bity). The most important title of Nimaathap, proving that she gave birth to at least one king.
- Mother of royal children (Egyptian: Mwt-mesw-nesw). This unique title may indicate that Nimaathap gave birth to several throne pretenders.
- King's wife (Egyptian: hemet-nesw). This title appears on a granite mug, but the authenticity of the artifact is questioned by scholars.
- She who says something and it is done (for her) immediately (Egyptian: Djed-khetneb-iret-nes). A seldom mentioned title of executive powers, giving the queen the right to give any command to the royal court.
- Sealer of the shipyard (Egyptian: Sedjawty-Khwj-retek). It is unclear, if this title actually was one of hers, or if the jar belonging to the seal simply originated from the (unnamed) shipyard official.

=== Family ===
Nimaathap is generally viewed as the queen consort of pharaoh Khasekhemwy. This is based on the fact that most of her seals were found in the tomb of Khasekhemwy at Abydos. It is unknown how many children Nimaathap had. Djoser, his immediate successor Sekhemkhet, Sanakht and Khaba are variably viewed as her sons.

== Historical role ==
Outdated theories once held that Nimaathap was the daughter of Khasekhemwy, that she married a king Nebka and that Djoser was the "first rightful king" from that bloodline. This would have fit with the Ramesside king lists, which let the 3rd dynasty begin with king Nebka. It would also have matched the chronicles of Manetho, who places a king Necherôphes before king Djoser (whom he calls Tósorthrós).

However these theories are now disproven by the large number of seal impressions (and a few stone bowl inscriptions) bearing Nimaathap's titles "mother of the king of Upper and Lower Egypt", "mother of royal children" and "king's wife". It is now believed that Nimaathap was a princess of the Northern royal house. When Khasekhemwy fought the Northern royal house at Upper Egypt and was victorious, Nimaathap was handed over as some kind of trophy.

Scholars are now also convinced that Djoser was indeed a founder of a new dynasty because Djoser and Nimaathap buried Khasekhemwy at the Thinite cemetery of Abydos, but Djoser founded a new Memphite cemetery at Saqqara. Djoser buried his father at the site where Khasekhemwy's house originated from. Together, Djoser and Nimaathap arranged the burial. After this, Nimaathap possibly supported her son for a few years, as the relief fragment from Heliopolis may indicate. After her death, Nimaathap was obviously long remembered and honoured as a co-founder of a new dynasty, as the mortuary service of the 4th dynasty mortuary priest Metjen proves.

== Tomb ==
Nimaathap's tomb has not been identified with certainty. Some Egyptologists consider mastaba K1 at Beit Khallaf to be hers, because a considerable amount of seal impressions with her name were found inside this tomb. Other scholars think that Nimaathap was planned to be buried at Abydos, because of her marriage with Khasekhemwy, but that this plan was never enacted as she outlived her husband. She also may have been buried somewhere at Abusir, because a high ranked official named Metjen was responsible for the mortuary cult around that queen. Usually, the overseer of a mortuary cult was buried close to the tomb he supervised.

== See also ==
- Prenomen (Ancient Egypt)
