= Hetephernebti =

- Queen consort of Egypt
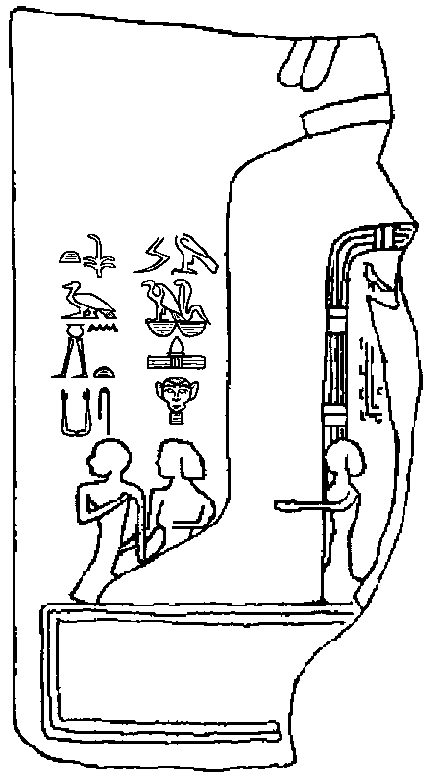
- Hetephernebti (center) at the feet of her husband, Djoser, next to her daughter Inetkaes (left), and a third woman whose name is lost (right) on one of the boundary stele from Djoser's pyramid at Saqqara
- Spouse: Djoser
- Issue: Inetkaes♀
- Dynasty: Third Dynasty of Egypt
- Father: Khasekhemwy?
- Mother: Nimaathap?

nbty Htp Hr
Hetephernebti
ḥtp-ḥr-nb.tỉ
in hieroglyphs
Era: Old Kingdom
(2686–2181 BC)

Hetephernebti was a queen of the Third Dynasty of the Old Kingdom of ancient Egypt. She was the only known wife of Pharaoh Djoser.

Hetephernebti and a King's Daughter Inetkaes were named on stelae found around Djoser's Saqqara pyramid complex and on a Heliopolis relief showing Djoser accompanied by the two of them.

Among her titles were "one who sees Horus" (m33.t-ḥrw-) and "great of sceptre" (wr.t-ht=s), both common for important queens in this period, also, she was called "King's Daughter", which means she was possibly a daughter of Djoser's predecessor Khasekhemwy and Nimaathap, thus a sister or half-sister of her husband.
