= Djoser =

Pharaoh of the third dynasty of Egypt

- Zoser, Netjerikhet, Tosorthros, Sesorthos
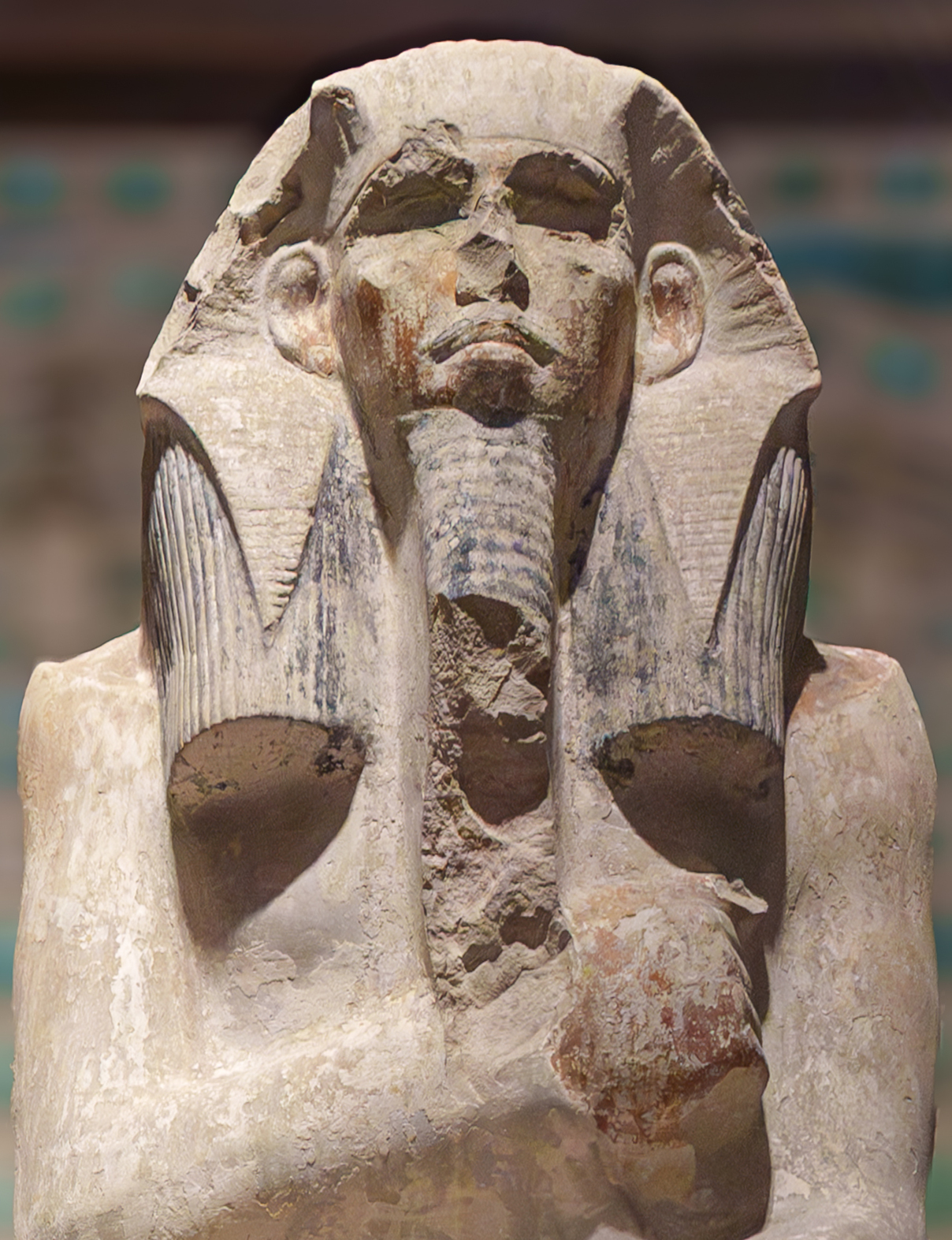
- Limestone Ka statue of Djoser from his pyramid serdab at Saqqara, Egyptian Museum, Cairo

Pharaoh
- Reign: 19 regnal years 28 regnal years c. 2686–2648 BC, 2687–2668 BC, 2668–2649 BC, 2667–2648 BC, or 2630–2611 BC
- Predecessor: Khasekhemwy (most likely) or Nebka
- Successor: Sekhemkhet (most likely) or Sanakht
Royal titulary
Horus name
Hor-Netjerikhet
Hr-nṯrj.ẖt
Horus, divine of body
G5	R8 D21 F32
Nebty name
Nebty-Netjerikhet
Nb.tj Nṯrj-ẖt
The two Ladies, divine of body
G16 R8 D21 F32
Golden Horus
Nub-Ra
Nbw-Rˁ
Golden one of Ra
N5 S12
Nub-Hor
Nbw-Ḥr
Golden one of Horus
G8
Nub-Ra-Hor
Nbw-Rˁ-Ḥr
Golden one of Ra-Horakhty
N5 G8
Prenomen
Nisut-Bity-Nebty-Netjerikhetnebu
nsw.t-bty-nb.ty nṯrj-ẖt-nbw
King of Upper and Lower Egypt,
he of the two ladies,
with a divine body of gold
M23 t L2 t G16 R8 D21 F32 S12
Abydos King List
....djeser-sa (Note: For unknown reasons, the first sign was deliberately removed.)
...-ḏsr-s3
...blessed sublime protector
< HASH D45 V17 >
Westcar Papyrus
Djoser
ḏsr
The blessed one
< D45 D21 Y1 >
Famine Stela
Djoser
ḏsr
The blessed one
< D45 O34 D21 >
Saqqara Tablet
Djoser
ḏsr
The blessed one
< D45 D21 >
Turin King List
Djoserit
Ḏsr-jt
The blessed one has arrived
< D45 r M17 X1 G7 > G7
- Consort: Hetephernebti
- Children: Inetkawes, maybe Sekhemkhet ?
- Father: Khasekhemwy
- Mother: Nimaethap
- Died: c. 2649 BC or c. 2611 BC
- Burial: Step pyramid at Saqqara
- Dynasty: 3rd Dynasty

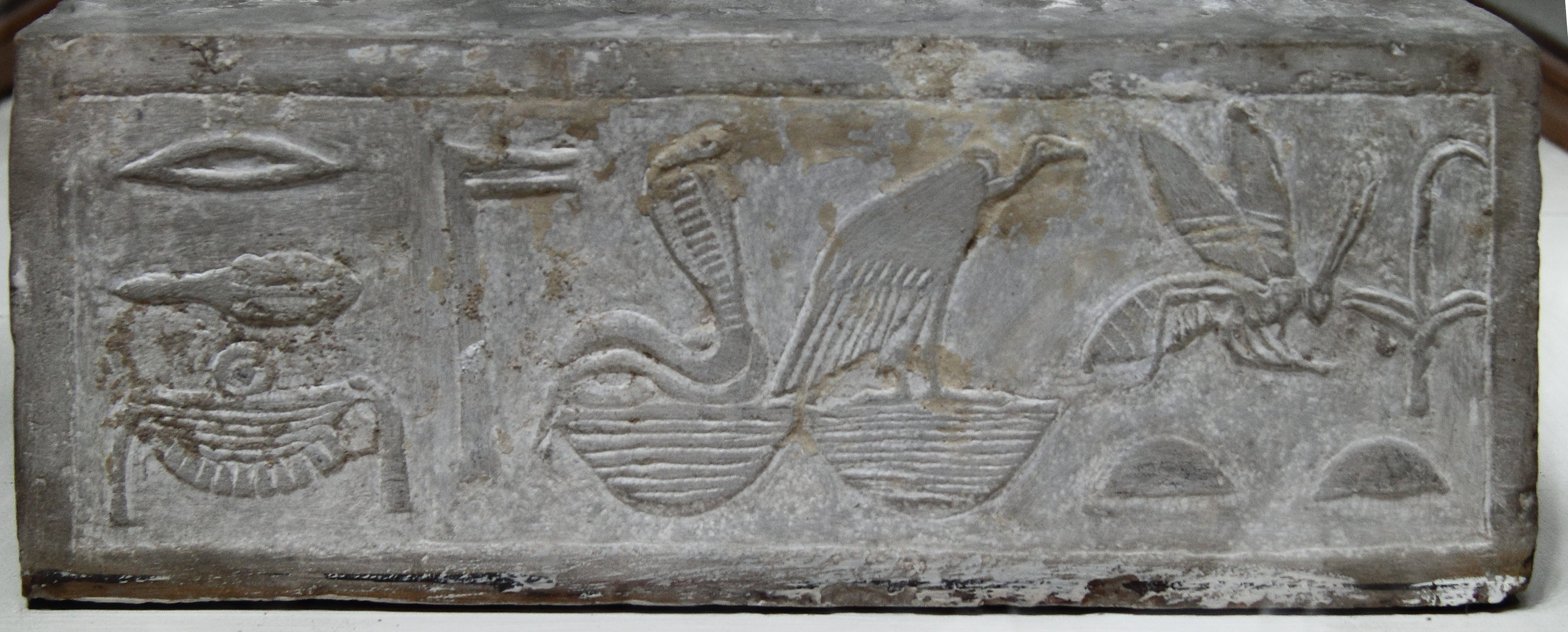
Egyptian Museum: Base of a Djoser statue with royal titulary

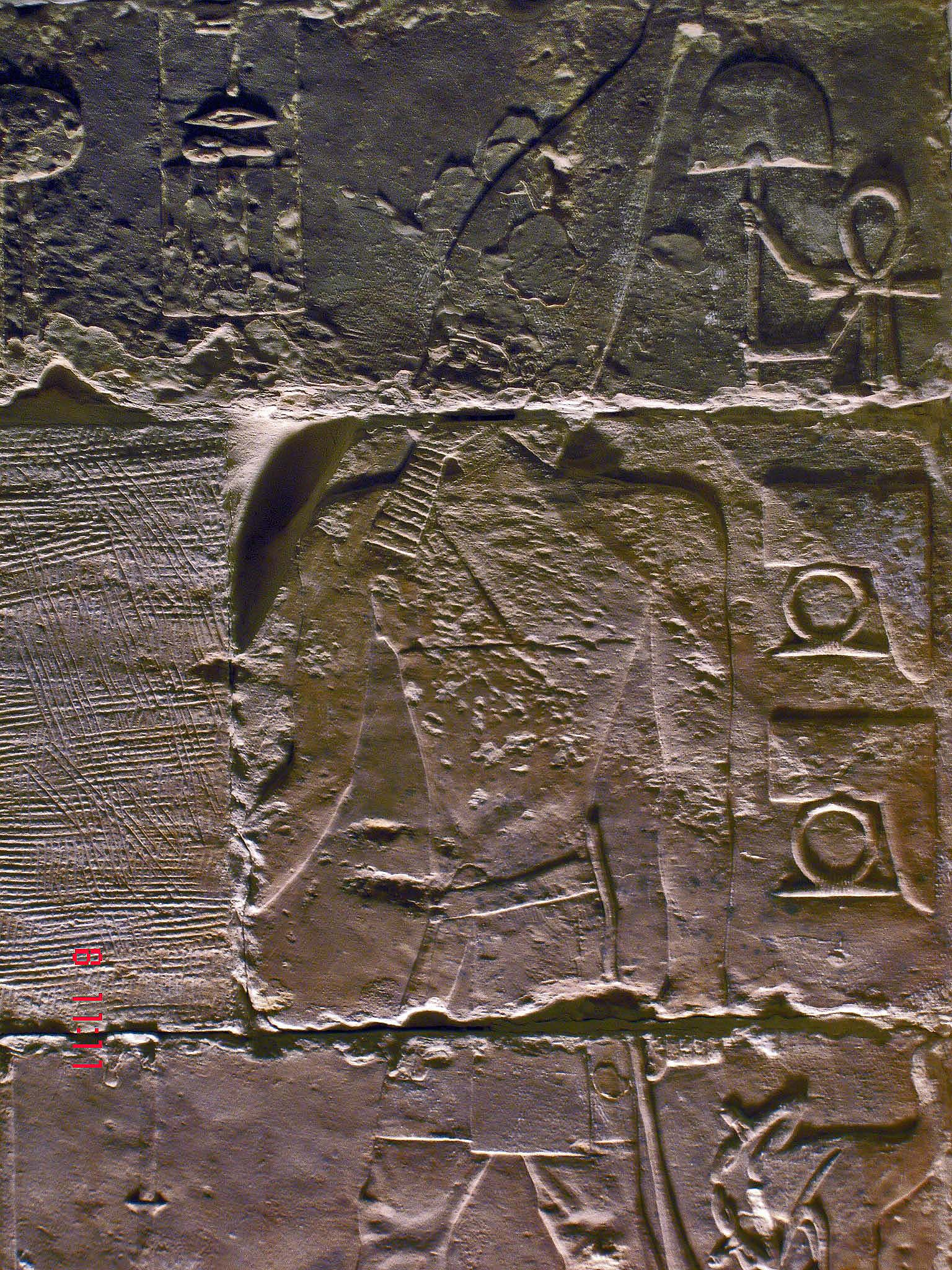
Niche with panel showing the king Netjerykhet (Djoser) walking towards the shrine of Horus of Behedet (modern Edfu).

Djoser (also read as Zoser) was an ancient Egyptian pharaoh of the 3rd Dynasty during the Old Kingdom, and was the founder of that epoch. He is also known by his Hellenized names Tosorthros (from Manetho) and Sesorthos (from Eusebius). He was the son of King Khasekhemwy and Queen Nimaathap, but whether he was also the direct successor to their throne is unclear. Most Ramesside king lists identify a king named Nebka as preceding him, but there are difficulties in connecting that name with contemporary Horus names, so some Egyptologists question the received throne sequence. Djoser is known for his step pyramid, which is the earliest colossal stone building in ancient Egypt.

== Identity ==
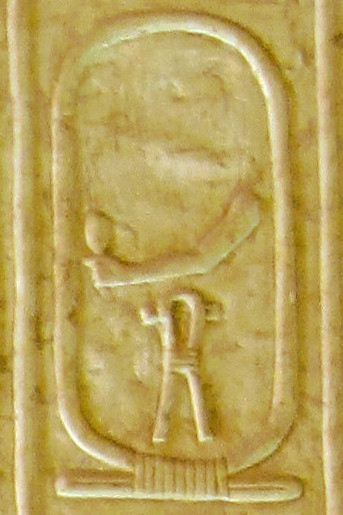
Cartouche name ...djeser-sah in the king list of Abydos. Note the upper part of the cartouche, which shows signs of erased hieroglyphs.

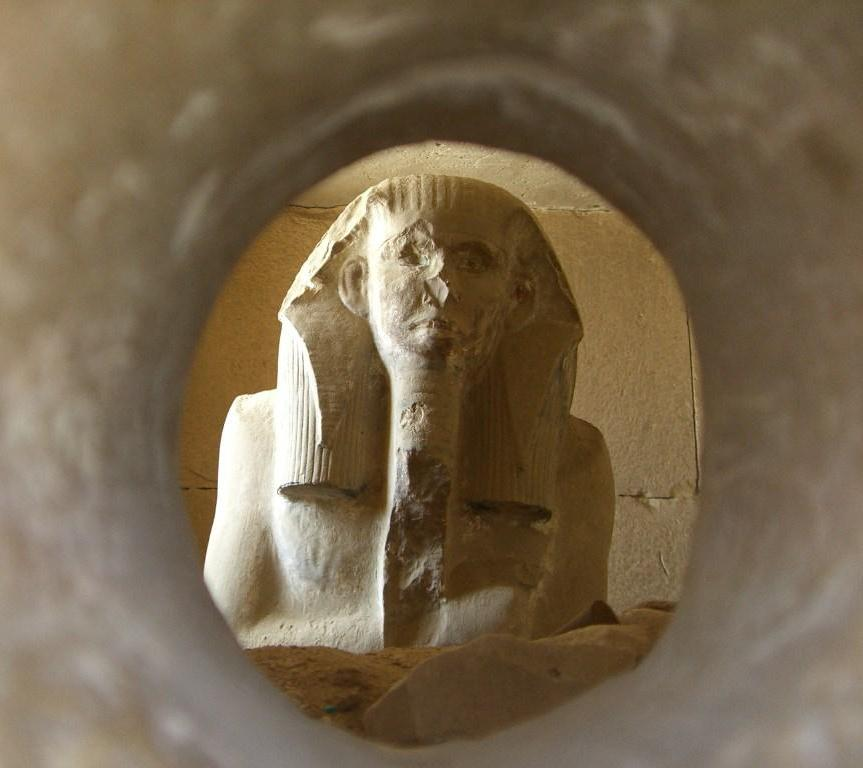
The plaster copy of pharaoh Djoser's statue peers out through the hole in his serdab.

The painted limestone statue of Djoser, now in the Egyptian Museum in Cairo, is the oldest known life-sized Egyptian statue. Today, at the site in Saqqara where it was found, a plaster copy of it stands in place of the original. The statue was discovered during the Antiquities Service Excavations of 1924–1925.

In contemporary inscriptions, he is called by his Horus name Netjerikhet, meaning "divine of body". Later sources, which include a New Kingdom reference to his construction and the Ptolemaic Famine Stela which features both names, help confirm that Netjerikhet and Djoser are the same person. Djoser was the first pharaoh since Nynetjer to only have Horus on his serekh.

While Manetho names Necherophes and the Turin King List names Nebka as the first ruler of the Third Dynasty, many Egyptologists now believe Djoser was first king of this dynasty, pointing out that the order in which some predecessors of Khufu are mentioned in the Westcar Papyrus suggests Nebka should be placed between Djoser and Huni, not before Djoser. More significantly, the English Egyptologist Toby Wilkinson has demonstrated that burial seals found at the entrance to Khasekhemwy's tomb in Abydos name only Djoser, rather than Nebka. This supports the view that it was Djoser who buried and, hence, directly succeeded Khasekhemwy, rather than Nebka.

== Family ==
Djoser is linked to Khasekhemwy, the last king of the Second Dynasty of Egypt, through his wife Queen Nimaethap (Nimaat-hap) via seals found in Khasekhemwy's tomb and at Beit Khallaf. The seal at Abydos names Nimaat-hap as the "mother of the king's children, Nimaat-hap". On mastaba K1 at Beit Khallaf, the same person is mentioned as the "mother of the dual king". Dating of other seals at the Beit Khallaf site place them to the reign of Djoser. This evidence suggests that Khasekhemwy is either the direct father of Djoser or that Nimaat-hap had him through a previous husband. German Egyptologist Gunter Dreyer found Djoser's sealings at Khasekhemwy's tomb at Umm El Qa'ab, further suggesting that Djoser was the direct successor of Khasekhemwy and that he finished the construction of the tomb.

Her cult seems to have still been active in the later reign of Sneferu.

Hetephernebti is identified as one of Djoser's queens "on a series of boundary stela from the Step Pyramid enclosure (now in various museums) and a fragment of relief from a building at Hermopolis" currently in the Egyptian museum of Turin.

Inetkawes was their only daughter known by name. There was also a third royal female attested during Djoser's reign, but her name is destroyed. The relationship between Djoser and his successor, Sekhemkhet, is not known, and the date of his death is uncertain.

== Reign ==
=== Third Dynasty ===
The lands of Upper and Lower Egypt were reunited into a single kingdom sometime around 2680 BC by Khasekhemwy following what appears to have been a civil war between the southern and northern regions. The period following the reunification of the crowns was one of prosperity, marked by the start of the Third Dynasty and the Old Kingdom of Egypt. The exact identity of the founder of the dynasty is a matter of debate, due to the fragmentary nature of the records from the period. Djoser is one of the principal candidates for the founder of the Third Dynasty. Other candidates are Nebka and Sanakht. Complicating matters further is the possibility that Nebka and Sanakht are referring to the same person.

Egyptologist Toby Wilkinson believes that the weight of archeological evidence favours Djoser (Netjerikhet) as Khasekhemwy's successor and therefore founder of the Third Dynasty. A seal from Khasekhemwy's tomb at Abydos, in combination with a seal from mastaba K1 at Beit Khallaf dated to Djoser's reign, links the two pharaohs together as father and son respectively. The seal at Abydos names a 'Nimaat-hap' as the mother of Khasekhemwy's children, while the other seal at Beit Khallaf names the same person as the 'mother of the dual-king'. Further archaeological evidence linking the reigns of the two pharaohs together are found at Shunet et-Zebib, which suggest that Djoser oversaw the burial of his predecessor. Ritual stone vessels found at the sites of the tombs – Khasekhemwy's tomb at Abydos and Djoser's tomb at Saqqara – of the two pharaohs also appear to have come from the same collection, as samples from both sites contain identical imagery of the god Min. This archeological evidence is supplemented by at least one historical source, the Saqqara king list, which names Djoser as the immediate successor of Bebti – a ramesside misreading of Khasekhemwy.

=== Length of reign ===
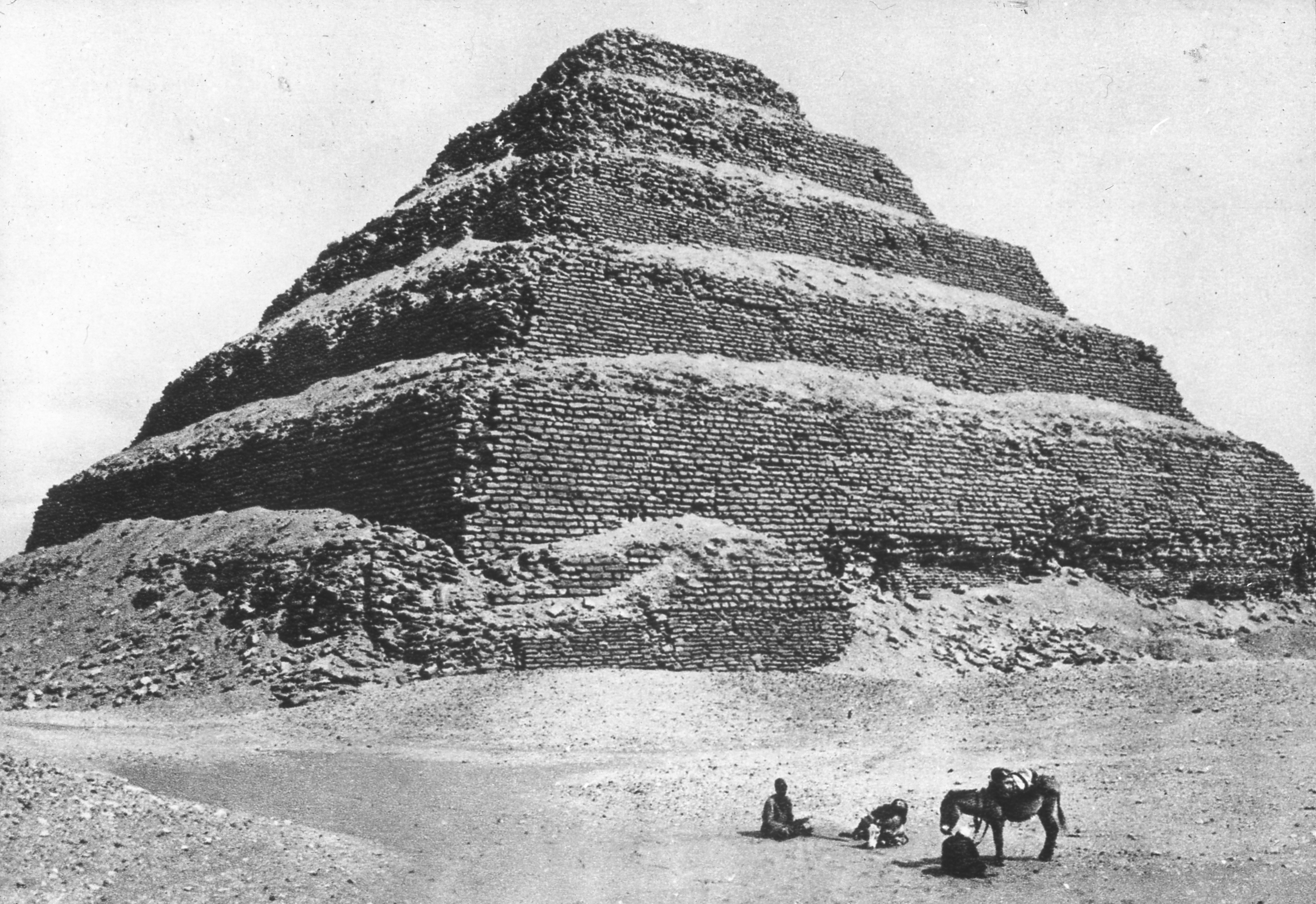
Step pyramid of Djoser, old photograph

Manetho states Djoser ruled Egypt for twenty-nine years, while the Turin King List states it was only nineteen years. Because of his many substantial building projects, particularly at Saqqara, some scholars argue Djoser must have enjoyed a reign of nearly three decades. Manetho's figure appears to be more accurate, according to Wilkinson's analysis and reconstruction of the Royal Annals. Wilkinson reconstructs the Annals as giving Djoser "28 complete or partial years", noting that the cattle counts recorded on Palermo stone register V, and Cairo Fragment 1, register V, for the beginning and ending of Djoser's reign, would most likely indicate his regnal years 1–5 and 19–28. Unfortunately, next to all entries are illegible today. The Year of coronation is preserved, followed by the year events receiving the twin-pillars and stretching the cords for the fortress Qau-Netjerw ("hills of the gods").

In support of the current reconstruction of the Royal Annals, it's believed that Ramesside scribes may have erroneously reduced Djoser's reign in the Turin King List from "29 years" to "19 years". In comparison, Djoser's father and predecessor Khasekhemwy's reign was similarly changed from "17 years" to "27 years". Therefore, Ramesside scribes may have erroneously attributed the first 10 years of Djoser's reign to Khasekhemwy.

Palermo stone, main fragment:

- Year of coronation (1st year): Appearance of the king of Lower- and Upper Egypt; unifying the two realms; circumambulation of the White Wall of Memphis. Four cubits, two palms, two and two-thirds fingers.
- 2nd year: Appearance of the ; appearance of the dual king; introduction of the king into the senut shrine. Four cubits, one and two-thirds palms
- 3rd year: Following of Horus, creating an image of Min. Two cubits, Three palms, two and three-fourth fingers
- 4th year: Appearance of the dual king, stretching the cord (at the building) "hills of the gods". Three cubits, Three palms, two fingers
- 5th year: Following of Horus... (rest is missing)

Cairo Stone, main fragment:

- 19th year: Following of Horus... (rest is missing)
- 20th year: Appearance of the dual king, creating an building of Anubis.
- 21st year: Following of Horus... (rest is missing)
- 22nd year: Appearance of the dual king... (rest is missing)
- 23rd year: Following of Horus... (rest is missing)
- 24th year: Appearance of the dual king... (rest is missing)
- 25th year: Following of Horus... (rest is missing)
- 26th year: Appearance of the dual king... (rest is missing)
- 27th year: Following of Horus... (rest is missing)
- 28th year: Appearance of the dual king... (rest is missing)
- year of death: The ...th month and ...th day. (damaged)

=== Period of reign ===
Various sources provide various dates for Djoser's reign. Professor of Ancient Near East history Marc van de Mieroop dates Djoser's reign to somewhere between 2686 BC to 2648 BC. Authors Joann Fletcher and Michael Rice date his reign from 2667 BC to 2648 BC giving a regnal period of 18 partial or complete years. Rice further states that Nebkha was Djoser's brother and predecessor. Writer Farid Atiya provides a similar regnal period to Fletcher and Rice, offset by a single year – 2668 BC to 2649 BC. This dating is supported by authors Rosalie and Charles Baker in Ancient Egypt: People of the Pyramids. Egyptologist Abeer el-Shahawy in association with the Egyptian Museum in Cairo places Djoser's reign to the period of 2687 BC to 2668 BC for a similar 18 partial or complete years. Author Margaret Bunson places Djoser as the second ruler of the Third Dynasty, and places his reign to the period of 2630 BC to 2611 BC for 19 partial or complete year reign. In her chronology, Djoser is preceded by Nebka as the "Founder of the Third Dynasty", reigning for the period 2649 BC to 2630 BC. She, like Rice, makes Nebka a brother of Djoser. The Palermo Stone lists the death of his predecessor, Khasekhemwy, as happening 2 months and 23 days into the year, and since no date for Djoser's coronation is listed, it can be assumed his reign began then.

=== Military expeditions ===
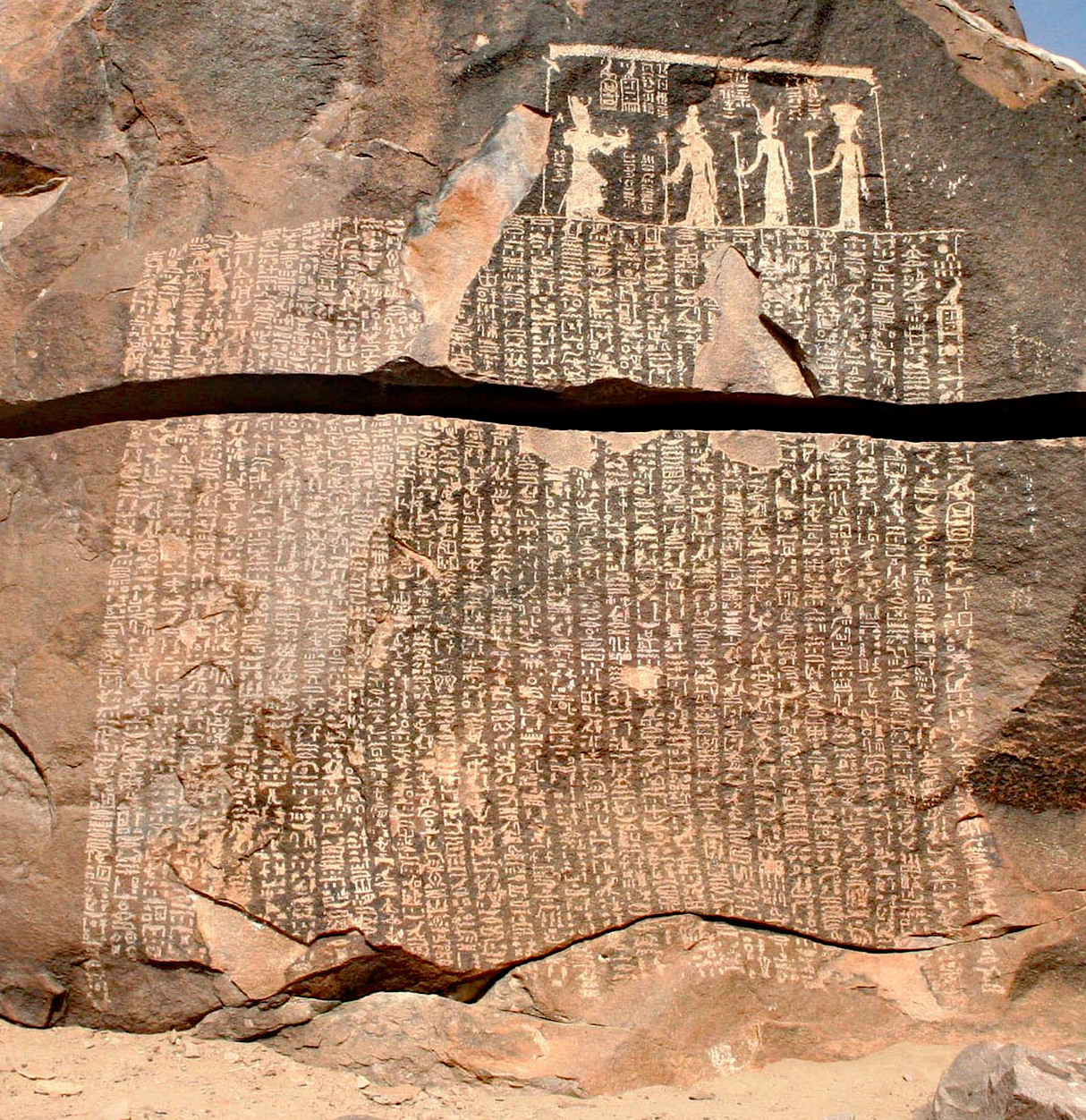
The Famine Stela, mentioning Djoser.

Djoser dispatched several military expeditions to the Sinai Peninsula, during which the local inhabitants were subdued. He also sent expeditions there to mine for valuable minerals such as turquoise and copper. This is known from inscriptions found in the desert there, sometimes displaying the banner of Set alongside the symbols and banner of Horus, as had been more common under Khasekhemwy. The Sinai was also strategically important as a buffer between the Nile valley and Asia.

=== Construction projects ===
Osirian statues of Djoser found in Heb-sed courtyard at Djoser´s Pyramid Complex in Saqqara

His most famous monument was his step pyramid, which was begun as a square mastaba and rises in a series of distinct "steps". This form would eventually lead to the standard pyramid tomb in the later Old Kingdom. Manetho, many centuries later, alludes to architectural advances of this reign, mentioning that "Tosorthros" discovered how to build with hewn stone, in addition to being remembered as the physician Aesculapius, and for introducing some reforms in the writing system. Modern scholars think that Manetho originally ascribed (or meant to ascribe) these feats to Imuthes, who was later deified as Aesculapius by the Greeks and Romans, and who corresponds to Imhotep, the famous minister of Djoser who engineered the Step Pyramid's construction.

Some fragmentary reliefs found at Heliopolis and Gebelein mention Djoser's name, and suggest he commissioned construction projects in those cities. Also, he may have fixed the southern boundary of his kingdom at the First Cataract. An inscription known as the Famine Stela and claiming to date to the reign of Djoser, but probably created during the Ptolemaic Dynasty, relates how Djoser rebuilt the temple of Khnum on the island of Elephantine at the First Cataract, thus ending a seven-year famine in Egypt. Some consider this ancient inscription as a legend at the time it was inscribed. Nonetheless, it does show that more than two millennia after his reign, Egyptians still remembered Djoser.

Although he seems to have started an unfinished tomb at Umm El Qa'ab in Abydos (Upper Egypt), Djoser was eventually buried in his famous pyramid at Saqqara in Lower Egypt. Since Khasekhemwy, a pharaoh from the 2nd dynasty, was the last pharaoh to be buried at Abydos, some Egyptologists infer that the shift to a more northerly capital was completed during Djoser's time.

== Djoser and Imhotep ==
One of the most famous contemporaries of king Djoser was his "head of the royal shipyard" and "overseer of all stone works", Imhotep. Imhotep oversaw stone building projects such as the tombs of King Djoser and King Sekhemkhet. It is possible that Imhotep was mentioned in the also famous Westcar Papyrus, in a story called "Khufu and the magicians". But because the papyrus is badly damaged at the beginning, Imhotep's name is lost today. A papyrus from the ancient Egyptian temple of Tebtunis, dating to the 2nd century AD, preserves a long story in the demotic script about Djoser and Imhotep. In Djoser's time, Imhotep was of such importance and fame that he was honoured by being mentioned on statues of King Djoser in his necropolis at Saqqara.

== Medieval tradition ==
Egyptian historian Al-Nuwayri (1279–1333) described Djoser as "a king who was a wise ruler of Egypt" and claimed that the Copts had a feast in honour of him called the "vine festival". Al-Nuwayri also visited the South tomb of the pyramid complex of Djoser in Saqqara, identifying it as the tomb of "Zosara" and describing a vault decorated with lapis lazuli, as well as a large court with a large granite door inscribed with 30 lines of hieroglyphs.

Egyptologist Okasha El-Daly noted that "Demotic romances of ancient Egyptian rulers such as Djoser, Inaros and Nectanebo also became popular in the medieval Arabic sources, which show them as heroes, with their names and deeds well recognised by the writers".

== Tomb ==
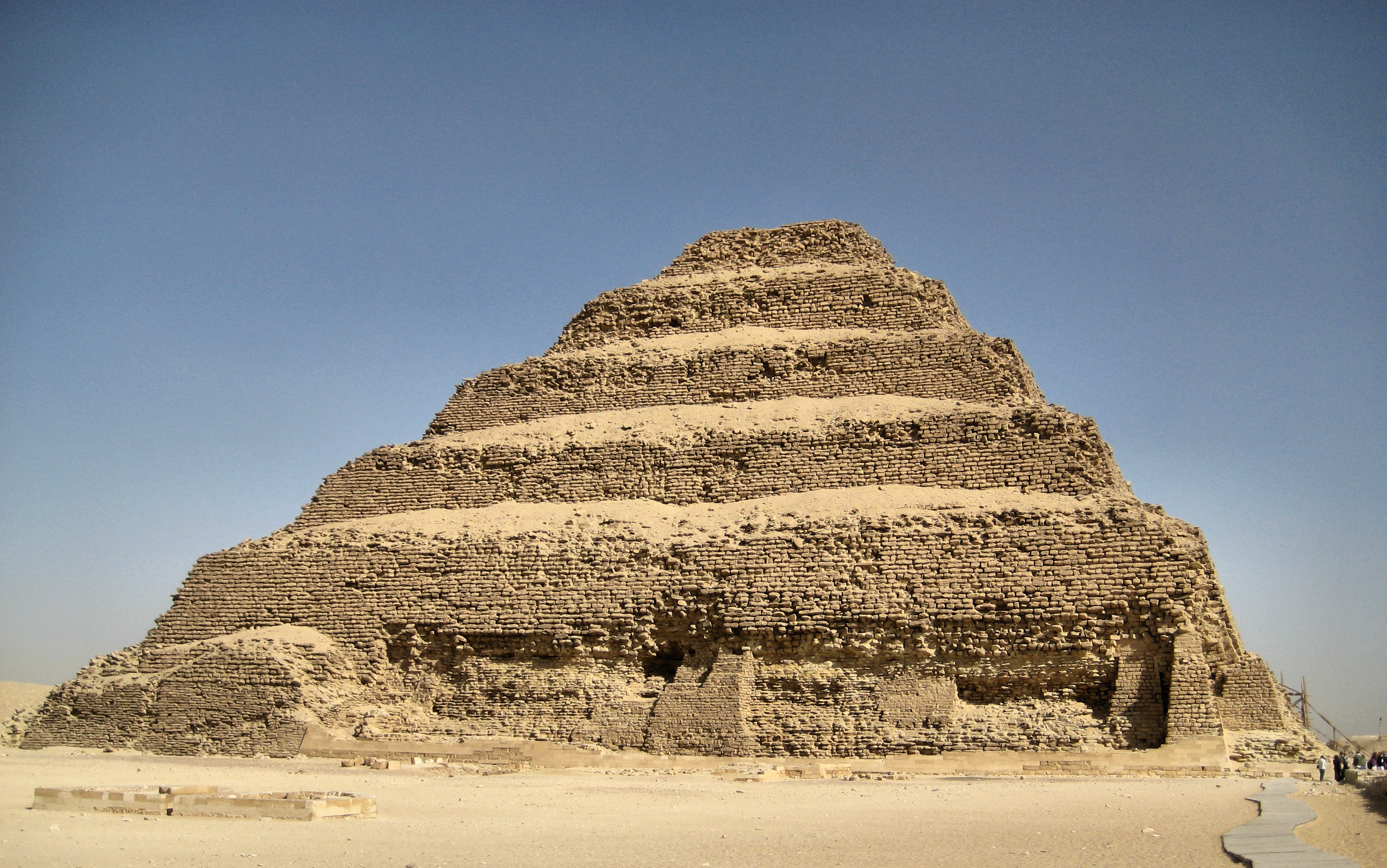
Step pyramid of Djoser at Saqqara, Egypt

Djoser was buried in his famous step pyramid at Saqqara. This pyramid was originally built as a nearly square mastaba, but then the building was expanded and five increasingly smaller "steps" were piled atop it, creating Egypt's first step pyramid. Supervisor of the building constructions was the high lector priest Imhotep.

=== The pyramid ===
The step pyramid is made of limestone. It is massive and contains only one tight corridor leading to the close midst of the monument, ending in a rough chamber where the entrance to the tomb shaft was hidden. This inner construction was later filled with rubble, for it was of no use anymore. The pyramid was once 62 metres high and had a base measurement of c. 125 × 109 metres. It was tightly covered in finely polished, white limestone.

=== Subterranean structure ===
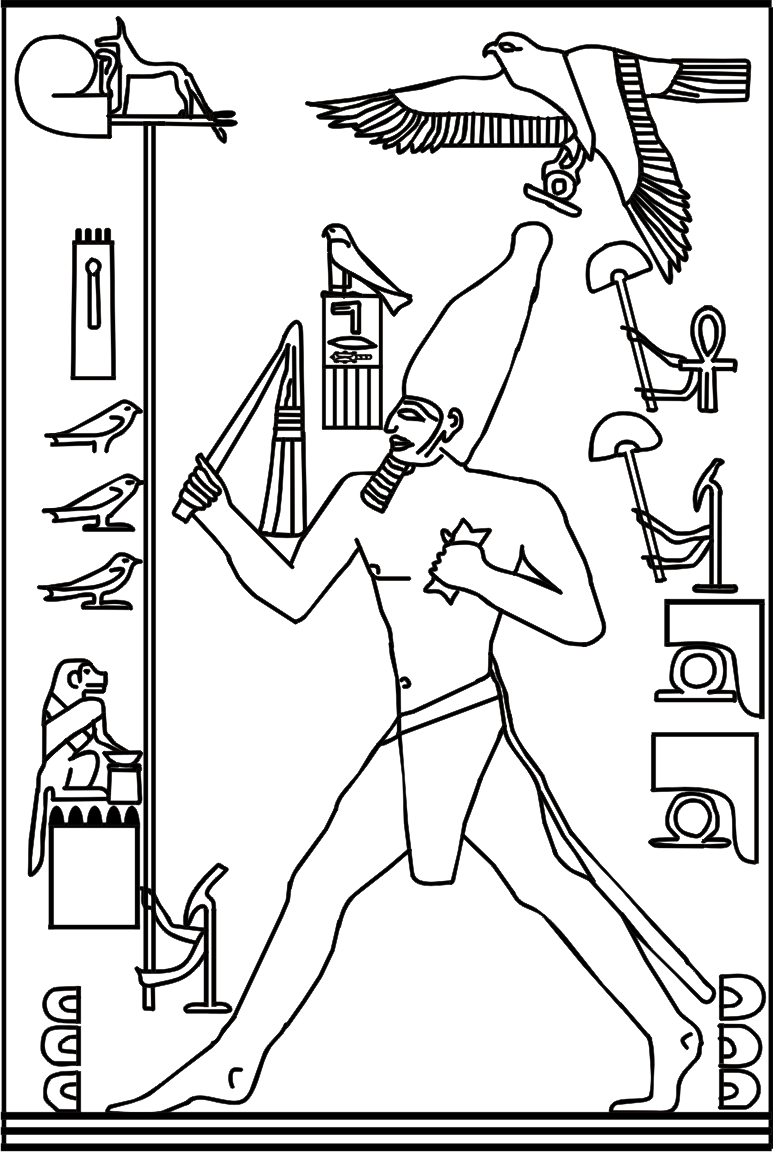
King Djoser running for the Heb-Sed celebration (relief from the underground galleries)

Under the step pyramid, a large maze of long corridors and chambers was dug. The burial chamber lies in the midst of the subterranean complex; a 28 meter deep shaft that leads directly from the surface down to the burial chamber. The shaft entrance was sealed by a plug stone with a weight of 3.5 tons. The subterranean burial maze contains four magazine galleries, each pointing straight to one cardinal direction. The eastern gallery contained three limestone reliefs depicting king Djoser during the celebration of the Heb-Sed (rejuvenation feast). The walls around and between these reliefs were decorated with bluish faience tiles. They were thought to imitate reed mats, as an allusion to the mythological underworld waters. The other galleries remained unfinished.

At the eastern side of the pyramid, very close to the blue chambers, eleven tomb shafts lead straight down for 30–32 metres, and then deviate in a right angle to the west. Shafts I–V were used for the burials of royal family members; shafts VI–XI were used as symbolic tombs for the grave goods of royal ancestors from dynasties I–II. More than 40,000 vessels, bowls and vases made of various kinds of stone were found in these galleries. Royal names such as of kings Den, Semerkhet, Nynetjer and Sekhemib were incised on the pots. It is now thought that Djoser once restored the original tombs of the ancestors, and then sealed the grave goods in the galleries in an attempt to save them.

=== Funerary complex ===
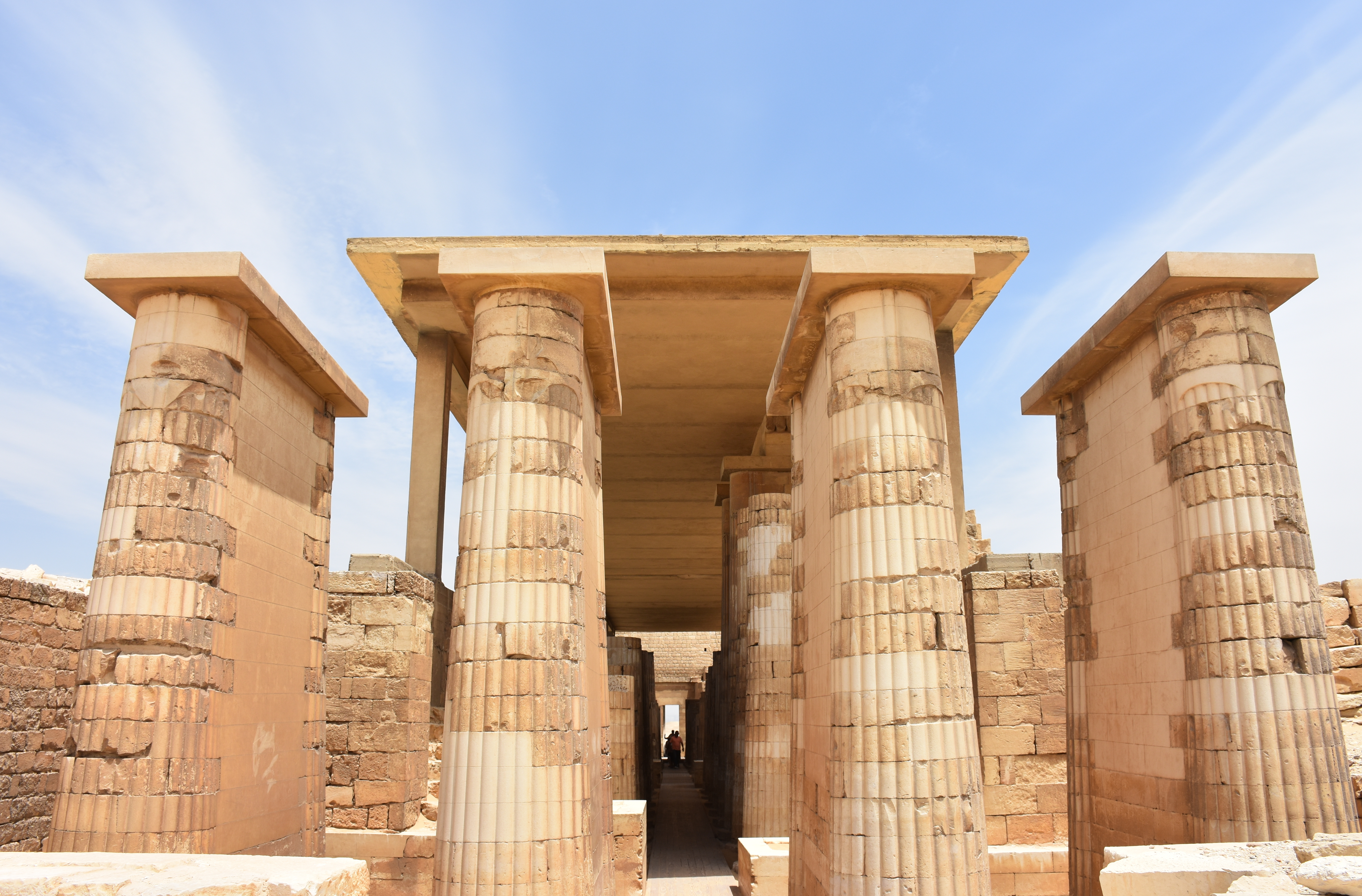
West end of the entrance colonnade of Djoser's necropolis complex, viewed from inside the south court

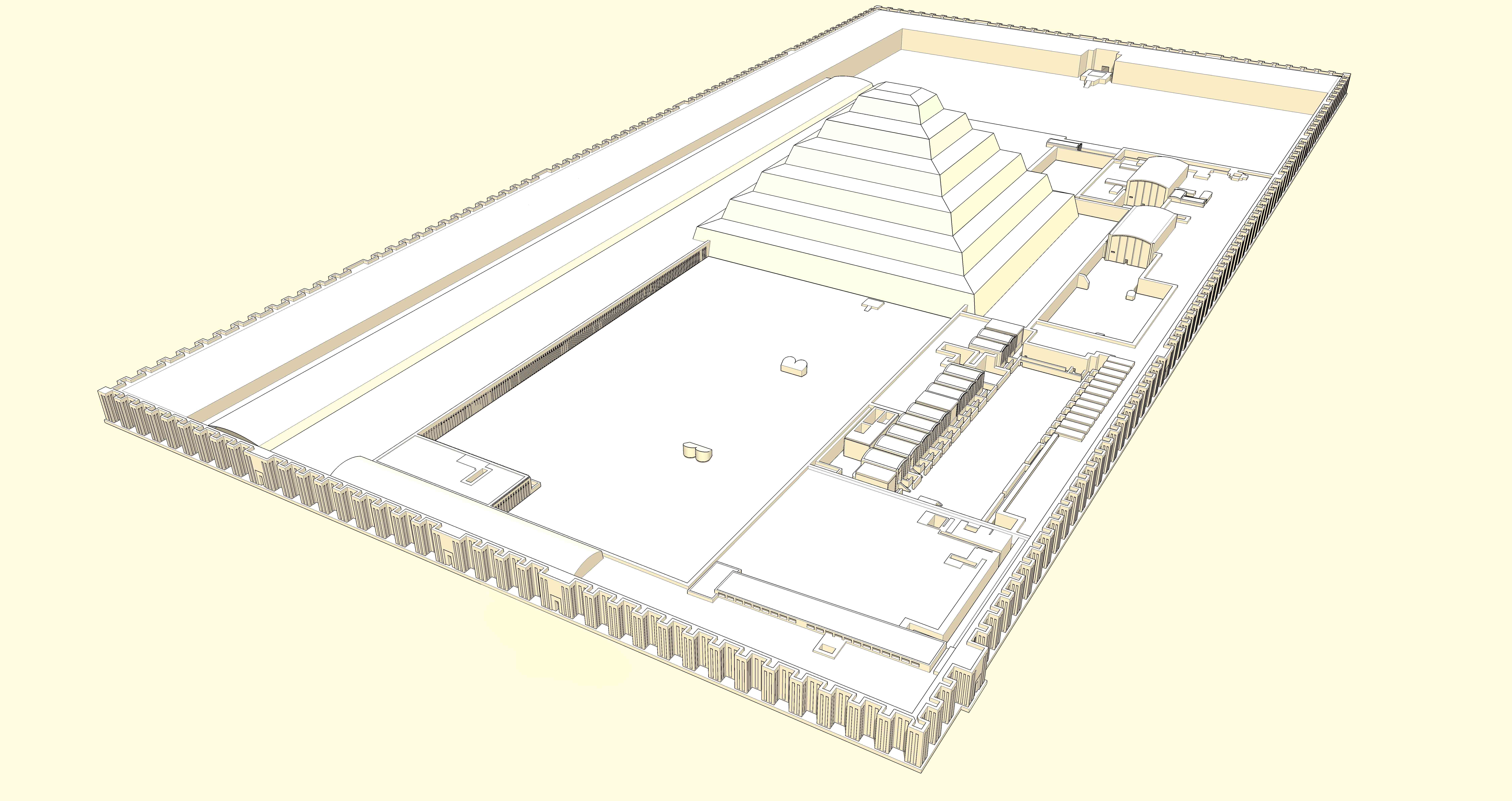
Aerial view of king Djoser's funerary complex

The funerary complex is the first architectural project to be built entirely out of stone. The complex is enclosed by a 10.5-meter-high stone wall, referred to as the enclosure wall. The wall had fourteen symbolic entrances but only one functional entrance. The complex includes Djoser's step pyramid in the center, surrounded by the south court, the north court, and the Heb-sed court. Along with the main courts, there is a roofed colonnade between the enclosure wall's functional entrance and the south court, and adjoining the north court, on the pyramid's north side, is a mortuary temple and a small serdab chamber that holds the seated statue of the king Djoser.

=== Serdab statue of Djoser ===
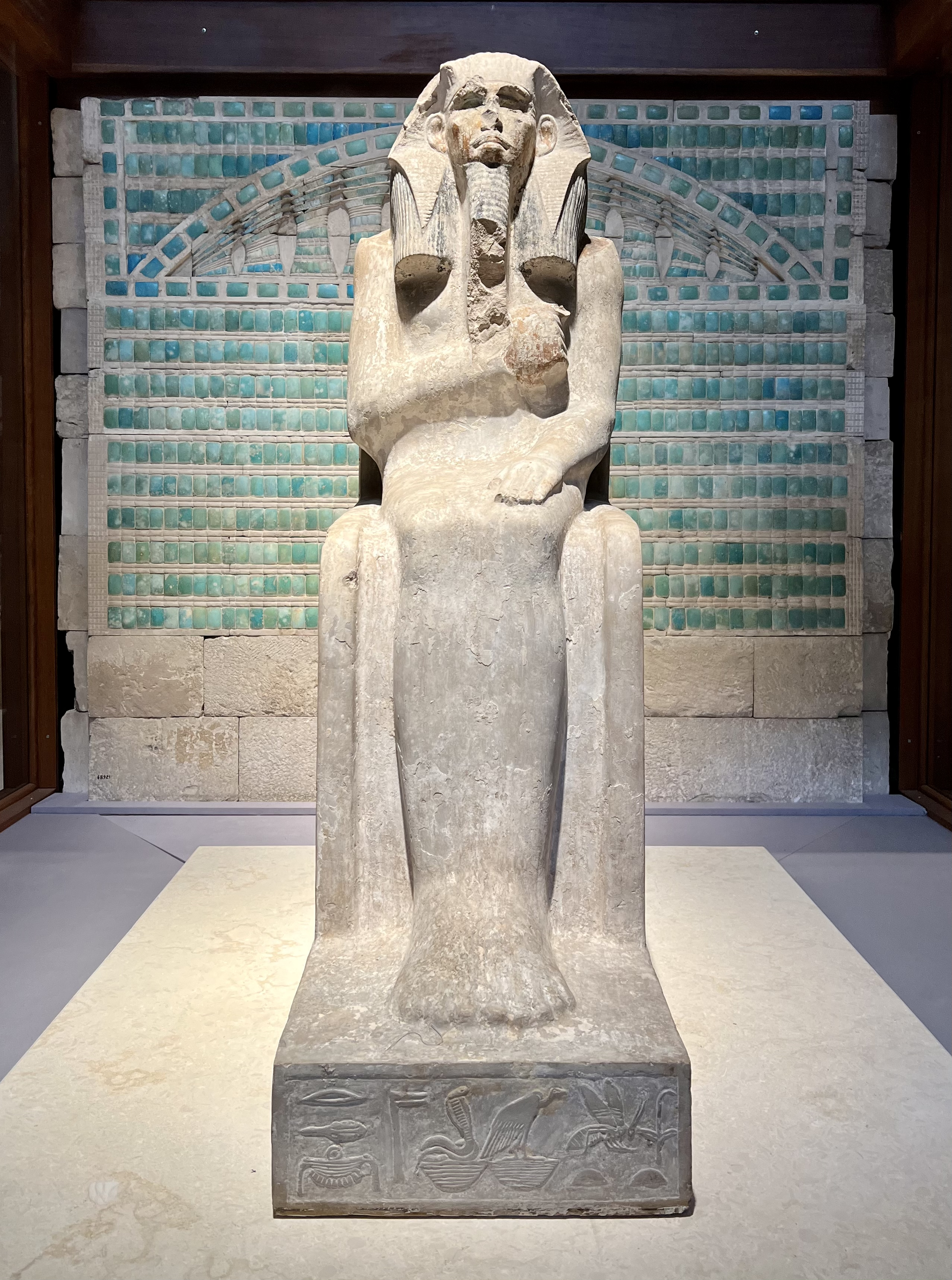
Serdab statue of Djoser in the Egyptian Museum in Cairo.

The statue of Djoser is walled into the serdab. The main purpose of the statue was to allow the king to manifest himself and be able to see the rituals performed in and out the serdab. This painted statue is plastered and made out of limestone. Each characteristic of the statue represents something, the striated tripartite wig he is wearing assimilates him to the living world as a dead king. The striped head cloth that covers the wig was used to cover all of his hair. This was a ritual that began to be used by kings in the fourth dynasty. The body is wrapped under a long robe, his hands are placed in a specific way. His right arm is horizontally displayed on his chest while his left arm is resting on his thigh. The placement of his arms are a resemblance to Khasekhem seat. One of the oldest representations of the Nine bows, and the first representation of the nine bows fully developed, is on the seated statue of Pharaoh Djoser. His feet rest upon part of the nine bows, which may have referred to Nubians during his reign because of their use of bows and arrows.

== See also ==
- Early Dynastic Period (Egypt)
- List of pharaohs
- Old Kingdom of Egypt

== Bibliography ==
- Adès, Harry (2007). A Traveller's History of Egypt. Interlink Books. ISBN 978-1-566-56654-4.
- Atiya, Farid (2006). Ancient Egypt. American University in Cairo Press. pp. 104–11. ISBN 977-17-3634-5.
- Baker, Rosalie; Baker, Charles (2001). Ancient Egyptians: People of the Pyramids. USA: Oxford University Press. pp. 15–19. ISBN 0-195-12221-6.
- Bard, Kathryn (2015). An Introduction to the Archaeology of Ancient Egypt (2 ed.). John Wiley & Sons. pp. 140–145. ISBN 978-1-118-89611-2.
- Berrett, LaMar C. (1 April 1996). Discovering the World of the Bible. Cedar Fort. ISBN 978-0-910523-52-3.
- Bestock, Laurel (2017). Violence and power in ancient Egypt : Image and Ideology Before the New Kingdom. Abingdon, United Kingdom: Routledge. ISBN 9780367878542.
- Brock, Lyla Pinch (2003). Egyptology at the Dawn of the Twenty-first Century: Proceedings of the Eight International Congress of Egyptologists, Volume 2. American University in Cairo Press. pp. 215–220. ISBN 9-774-24714-0.
- Bunson, Margaret (2014). Encyclopaedia of Ancient Egypt. Infobase Publishing. p. 103. ISBN 978-1-438-10997-8.
- Dieter, Arnold (2005). Temples of Ancient Egypt. I.B.Tauris. pp. 40–47. ISBN 1-850-43945-1.
- Dodson, Aiden; Hilton, Dyan (2004). The Complete Royal Families of Ancient Egypt. Thames & Hudson. ISBN 0-500-05128-3.
- Edwards, Iorwerth Eiddon Stephen; Gadd, Cyril John; Hammond, Nicholas Geoffrey Lampiere (1971). The Cambridge Ancient History (Third ed.). Cambridge University Press. pp. 145–169. ISBN 0-521-07791-5.
- El-Shahawy, Abeer; Al-Masri, Mathaf (2005). The Egyptian Museum in Cairo. American University in Cairo Press. p. 39. ISBN 9-771-72183-6.
- Fletcher, Joann (2015). The Story of Egypt. Hachette UK. ISBN 978-1-444-78515-9.
- Kleiner, Fred; Mamiya, Christin (2009). Gardner's Art Through The Ages: A Global History. Cengage Learning. pp. 57–59. ISBN 978-0-495-41058-4.
- Kleiner, Fred (2015). Gardner's Art Through The Ages: A Global History. Cengage Learning. pp. 59–61. ISBN 978-1-305-54484-0.
- Mieroop, Marc van der (2010). A History of Ancient Egypt. John Wiley & Sons. pp. 56–57. ISBN 978-1-405-16070-4.
- Poo, Mu-chou (1 February 2012). Enemies of Civilization: Attitudes toward Foreigners in Ancient Mesopotamia, Egypt, and China. SUNY Press. ISBN 978-0-7914-8370-1.
- Rice, Michael (1999). Who's who in Ancient Egypt. Psychology Press. pp. 50–51. ISBN 0-415-15448-0.
- Robins, Gay (2014). The Art of Ancient Egypt. British Museum Press. p. 44.
- Romer, John (2007). The Great Pyramid: Ancient Egypt Revisited. Cambridge University Press. p. 251. ISBN 978-0-521-87166-2.
- Wilkinson, Toby (2001). Early Dynastic Egypt. London: Routledge. ISBN 0415260116.
- Wilkinson, Toby (2000). Royal Annals of Ancient Egypt: the Palermo Stone and Its Associated Fragments. London: Kegan Paul International. ISBN 0710306679.
