= Menka (queen) =

Ancient Egyptian queen consort

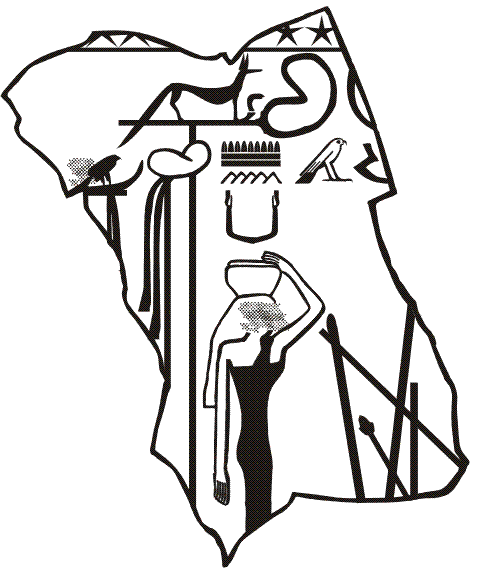
- Illustration of the fragment of the basalt relief depicting Menka
- Spouse: Uncertain, Khasekhemwy (?)
Egyptian name
< mn n D28 >Menka (Men ka)
Mn k3
(My) Ka shall be durable
- Dynasty: 2nd Dynasty

Menka was thought to be the name of an ancient Egyptian queen consort of the late Second Dynasty, and appears as such in a few publications. However, a review of the evidence makes it likely that a woman called Menka was never a queen.

== Fragment ==
Very little is known about the life of Menka, whose identity is known only from a basalt fragment most likely coming from Gebelein. The name "Menka" means the ka shall be durable and the fragment with her name also includes hieroglyphs that could be read as who sees Horus, which was the title of queens in the early dynastic age and during the Old Kingdom. The fragment also includes a depiction of her.

The relief depicts Menka as a standing woman, in a close-fitting dress, with a large, hemispherical vessel on her head and with standards lined up behind her. The hieroglyphs do not indicate who her consort was. Egyptologist Wolfgang Helck noticed that the scene bears considerable stylistic resemblance to an unfinished scene located on a basalt relief at the archaeological site of Gebelein, that is attributed to King Khasekhemwy, who was the last Pharaoh of the Second Dynasty. Helck has suggested that the fragment of Menka's relief may also originate from that site.

Vivienne Callender reviewed the evidence of the relief. She noted that the woman shown there bears a vessel on the head. This is typical for the depiction of an offering bearer, but no queen is ever shown in this position. The hieroglyphic inscription might not relate to the woman depicted. Menka was therefore most likely a servant shown on this relief, not a queen.
