= Khasekhemwy =

Last pharaoh of the second dynasty of Egypt

- Khasekhemui, Cheneres
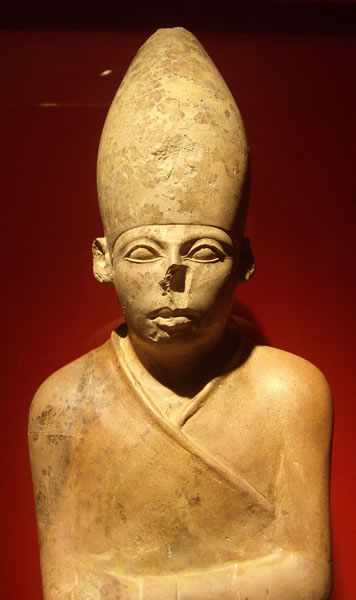
- Statue of Khasekhemwy, Ashmolean Museum

Pharaoh
- Reign: 18 years c. 2690 BC
- Predecessor: Sekhemib-Perenmaat or Seth-Peribsen
- Successor: Djoser
Royal titulary
Horus name
Khasekhem
Ḫꜥj-sḫm
Horus, he whose power has appeared
G5	N28 S42
Second Horus name: Khasekhemwy
Ḫꜥj-sḫm.wj
Horus, he whose two powers has appeared
G5	N28 sxm sxm
Horus-Seth-name
Hor-Set Khasekhemwy
(Ḥr -Stẖ) ḫꜥj sḫm.wj
He whose two powers has appeared
G5 E20	N28 sxm sxm
Full Horus-Seth-name
Hor-Set Khasekhemwy Netjerwy Hetepimef
(Ḥr -Stẖ) ḫꜥj sḫm.wj ḫtp nṯrwj jm=f
He whose two powers has appeared, The two powers are at peace within him
G5 E20	N28 sxm sxm Y1 G7 G7 M42 I9
Nebty name
Khasekhem
Nb.tj-ḫꜥj-sḫm
He whose power has appeared
G16 N28 S42
Second Nebty name: Khasekhemwy Nebwkhetsen
Nb.tj-ḫꜥj-sḫm.wj-nbw-ḫt-sn
He whose two powers has appeared, their bodies are of gold
G16 N28 S42 S42 S12 F32 S29 N35
Prenomen
(reconstitution) Nisut-Bity-Khastwy
nsw.t-bjtj-ḫ3st.wj
King of Upper and Lower Egypt, the two powers of the two deserts
M23 t L2 t N25 N25 t S42 S42
Abydos King List
Djadjay
Ḏꜣḏꜣj
He of the two forests
< U28 U28 D1 i i >
Saqqara Tablet
Beb(e)ti
Bbtj
< b b N21 i i >
Turin King List
Beb(e)ti
Bbtj
< b b t Z4 HASH HASH >
- Consorts: Nimaathap, Menka (?)
- Children: Djoser; Hetephernebti; Sekhemkhet ? Sanakht ? Khaba ? Shepset-ipet ?
- Died: 2686 BC
- Burial: Tomb V at Umm el-Qa'ab
- Monuments: Shunet ez Zebib, fort of Nekhen, Gisr el-Mudir ?
- Dynasty: 2nd Dynasty

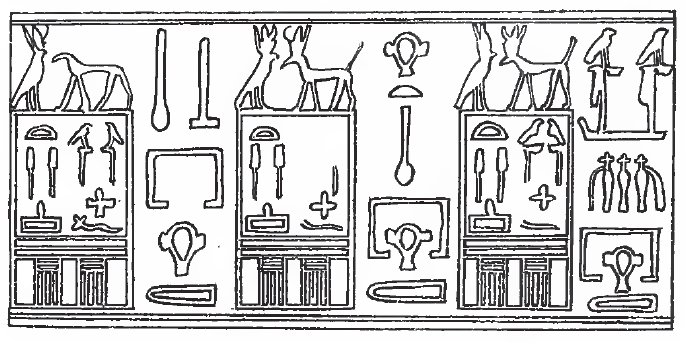
Seal of "Khasekhemwy" with the symbol of unification with the double crown of Upper and Lower Egypt being worn both by Horus and Seth, on a container of state treasury warehouse for the redistribution of agricultural production.

Khasekhemwy (c. 2690 BC; Ḫꜥj-sḫm.wj, also rendered Kha-sekhemui) was the last Pharaoh of the Second Dynasty of Egypt. Little is known about him, other than that he led several significant military campaigns, reunified Egypt by his 13th year and built the large mudbrick structure known as Shunet El Zebib.

His Horus name Ḫꜥj-sḫm.wj can be interpreted as "The Two Powerful Ones Appear", but the name is recorded in many variants, such as Ḥr-Ḫꜥj-sḫm (Horus, he whose power appears), ḫꜥj sḫm.wj ḥtp nṯrwj jm=f (the two powers appear in that the ancestors rest within him) (etc.) (Note: the "=" sign is used to notate suffixes. Alternatively, "." sign can be used.) He is also known under his later traditioned birth name Bebti (which is also one of the names of the god Horus) and under his Hellenized name Cheneres (by Manetho; derived from Khasekhemwy).

== Reign ==
=== Length of Reign ===
Khasekhemwy ruled for close to 18 years, with a floruit in the early 27th century BC. The exact date of his reign in Egyptian chronology is unclear but would fall roughly in between 2690–2670 BC.

According to Toby Wilkinson's study of the Palermo Stone in Royal Annals of Ancient Egypt, this near contemporary 5th dynasty document assigns Khasekhemwy a reign of 17.5 or nearly 18 full years. Wilkinson suggests that a reign of 18 "complete or partial years" can be attributed to Khasekhemwy since the Palermo Stone and its associated fragments record Years 3-6 and Years 12-18 of this king and notes that his final year is recorded in the preserved section of the document. Since the cattle count is shown to be regularly biennial during the second dynasty from the Palermo Stone (the year of the 6th, 7th and 8th count is preserved on the document plus full years after these counts respectively), a figure of c. 18 years is likely correct for Khasekhemwy. (or c. 18 years 2 months and 23 days from the main fragment of the Palermo Stone)

In addition, Manetho states Khasekhemwy ruled Egypt for thirty years, while the Turin King List states it was only twenty-seven years and a lifespan of forty years. However, both are considered unreliable as they were written long after Khasekhemwy's death whereas the Palermo Stone was carved 200 years after Khasekhemwy's death and is thought to be more accurate.

=== Events ===
Khasekhemwy is normally placed as the successor of Seth-Peribsen, though some Egyptologists believe that he was the successor of Sekhemib-Perenmaat and that another Pharaoh, Khasekhem, ruled between them. Most scholars, however, believe that Khasekhem and Khasekhemwy are, in fact, the same person. Khasekhem may have changed his name to Khasekhemwy after he defeated Seth-Peribsen and reunited Upper and Lower Egypt following a civil war between the followers of the god Horus led by himself and the followers of the god Seth led by Peribsen. Others believe Khasekhemwy only defeated Seth-Peribsen after returning to Egypt from putting down a revolt in Nubia. Either way, he ended the infighting of the Second dynasty and reunited Egypt by his 12th year on the throne, since the Palermo Stone first refers to him as "the Dual King" by his 13th year.

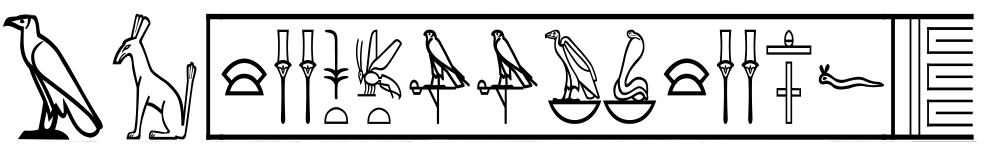
Khasekhemwy is unique in Egyptian history as having both the symbols of Horus and Seth on his serekh. At the beginning of his reign he adopted the Horus name Khasekhem, "The powerful one has appeared", which clearly showed his allegiance to Horus. Later, however, after defeating Peribsen, he added the symbol of Seth next to Horus and added the epithet to his royal serekh, / and accordingly changed his name to the dual form Khasekhemwy, "The two powers have appeared", along with the addition "The two powers are at peace with him". Some Egyptologists believe that this was an attempt to unify the two factions; but after his death, Seth was dropped from the serekh permanently. Khasekhemwy was the earliest Egyptian king known to have built statues of himself.

Khasekhemwy apparently undertook considerable building projects upon the reunification of Egypt. He built in stone at el-Kab, Hierakonpolis, and Abydos. Khasekhemwy built enclosures at Nekhen, at Abydos (a structure known as Shunet ez Zebib), and was buried in the necropolis at Umm el-Qa'ab in Tomb V. He may also have built the Gisr el-Mudir at Saqqara.

An inscription on a stone vase records him “fighting the northern enemy within Nekheb”. This means that Lower Egypt may have invaded and almost taken the capital of Nekhen.

=== Year-by-year records ===
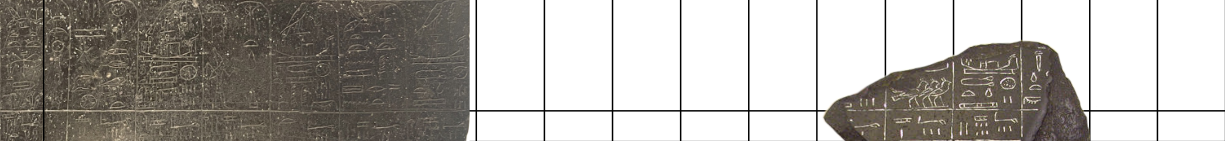
The events of Khasekhemwy on the Royal Annals

The Palermo Stone records the events of the twelfth to final years of Khasekhemwy's reign, and the London Fragment records the events of his third to sixth years of reign.

London Fragment:

- 3rd year: first occasion of the census of gold [and fields]
- 4th year: Following of Horus; second occasion of the census [of gold and fields]
- 5th year: ...of the common people
- 6th year: Following of Horus; third [occasion of the census of gold and fields]

Palermo stone, main fragment:

- 12th year: Following of Horus; sixth occasion of the census [of gold and fields]
- 13th year: Appearance of the Dual King; construction in stone 'The Goddess Endures'
- 14th year: Following of Horus; seventh occasion of the census of gold and fields
- 15th year: Creation of the copper statue "High is Khasekhemwy"
- 16th year: Following of Horus; eighth occasion of the census of gold and fields
- 17th year: Fourth occasion of reaching the wall; ship-building in Duadjefa
- year of death: 2 months and 23 days

== Family ==
Khasekhemwy's wife was Queen Nimaathap, mother of the King's Children. They were the parents of Djoser and Djoser's wife Hetephernebti. It is also possible that Khasekhemwy's sons were Sekhemkhet, Sanakhte, and Khaba, the three kings succeeding Djoser. Nimaathap was a northern princess who he titled “King bearing mother”.

== Attestations ==
Khasekhemwy is attested by several artifacts.

=== Statue of Khasekhemwy ===
A lime statue of king Khasekhemwy, one of the earliest known life-size statues of an Egyptian pharaoh, (Note: The earliest known intact pharaonic statue belongs to Nynetjer whereas the earliest known fragment of an pharaonic statue belongs to Den.) is on display in the Ashmolean Museum (AN1896-1908 E.517). The statue comes from the "Main Deposit" at Hierakonpolis, and is dated to about 2700-2686 BC. It was discovered by Flinders Petrie in 1896.

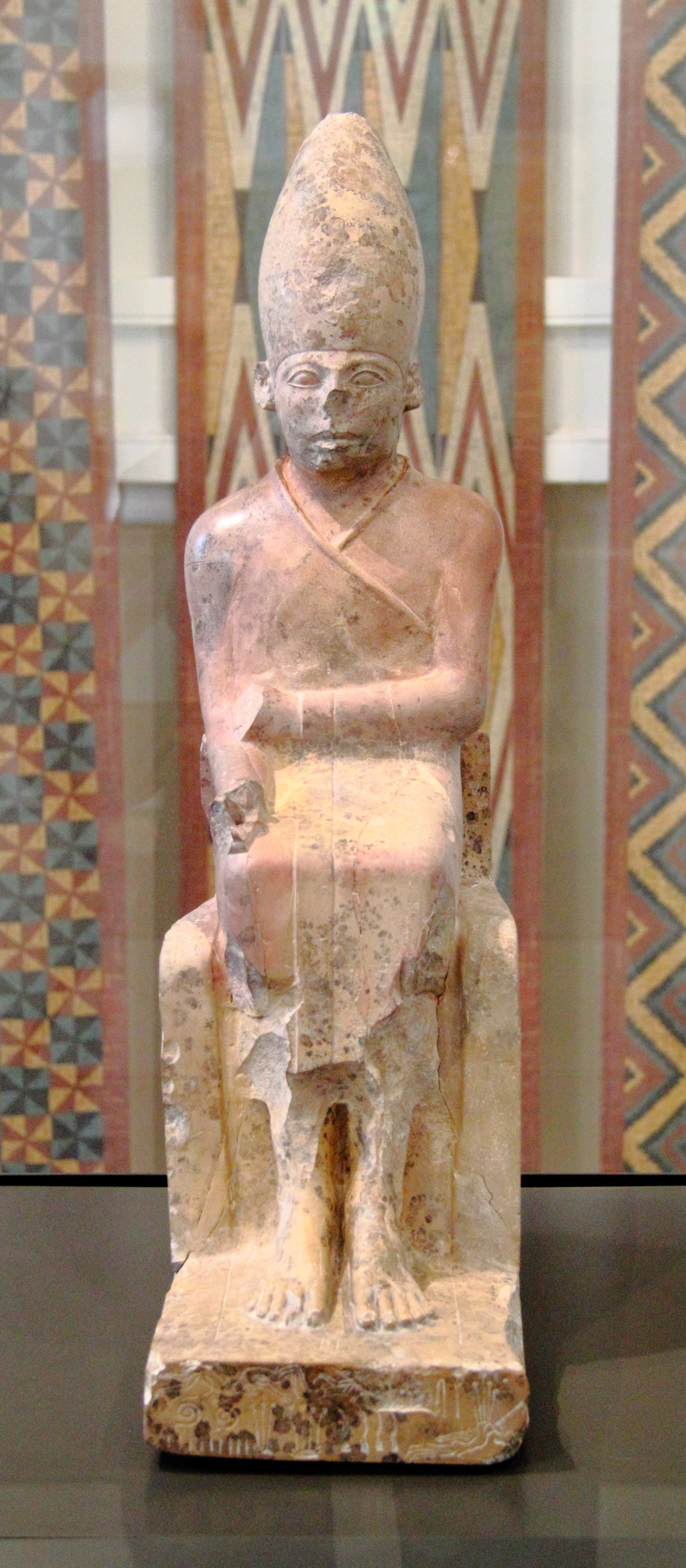
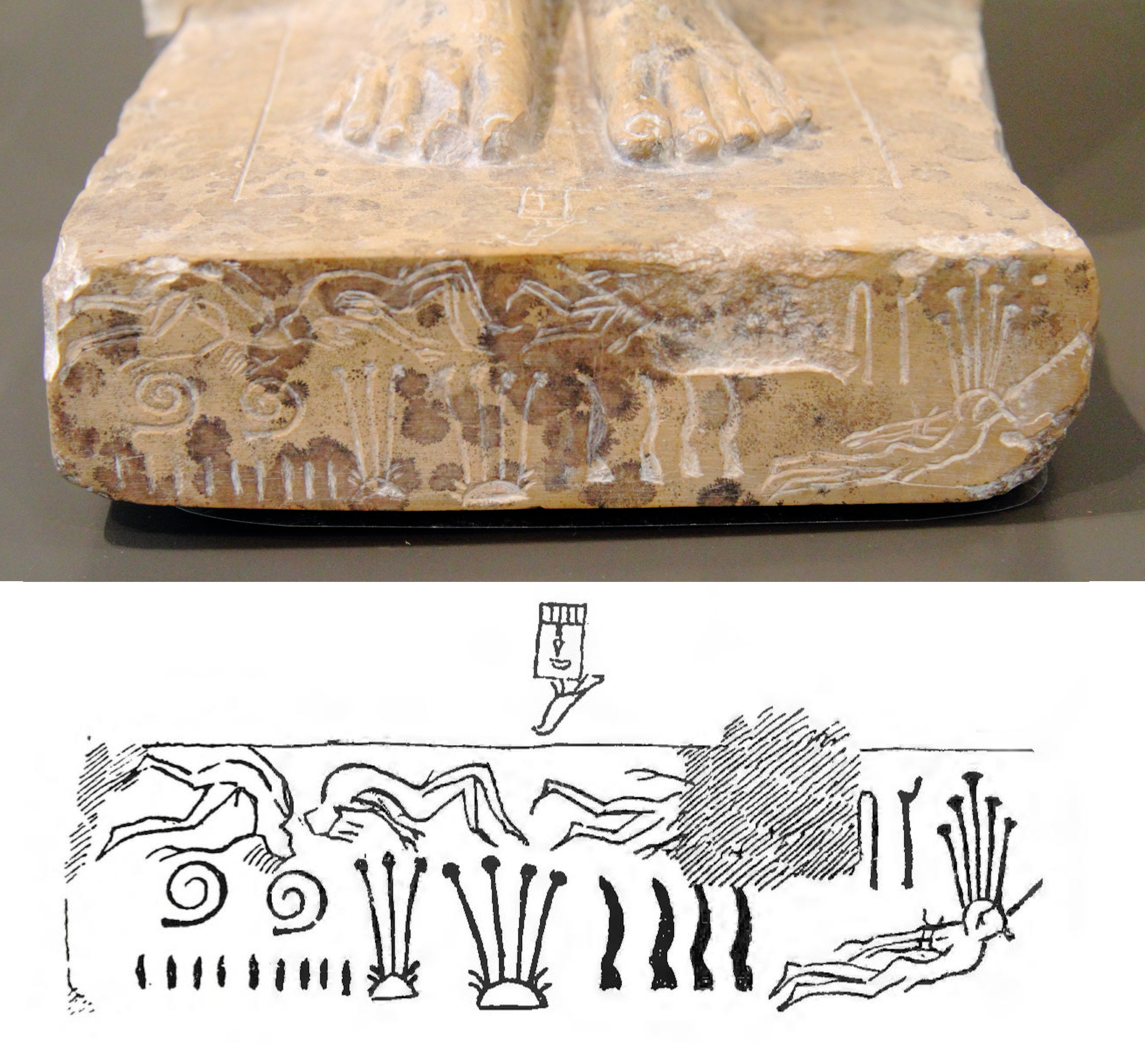
Statue of Khasekhemwy, Hierakonpolis, 2700-2686 BC (Ashmolean Museum)

The king wears the White Crown of Upper Egypt, and is dressed in a long robe. His right fist is drilled so as to attach a separate object, possibly a mace handle or a scepter. The king's name, Khasekhem, is inscribed in front of his feet. It is inscribed within a representation of the palace façade (the serekh), and the falcon god Horus stands on top.

The base of the statue has depictions of killed enemies on its four sides, recording a military campaign against the 'northern rebels', referring to the inhabitants of the Nile Delta. On the front, the number of slain enemies is given as 47,209 dead, with a symbol generally considered as designating "Libyans". This scene seems to record the victory of Khasekhemwy over a northern Egyptian population led by their ruler, Besh. The name Besh may be a variation or nomen of Peribsen, or more probably the name of a Libyan northern tribe near the Fayum. This iconography of the king crushing enemies at his feet would remain a central theme of royal iconography for the next three millennia.

== Tomb ==
He was buried in Tomb V, the last such royal tomb built in the Umm el-Qa'ab necropolis. The trapezoidal tomb measures some 70 meters (230 ft) in length and is 17 meters (56 ft) wide at its northern end, and 10 meters (33 ft) wide at its southern end. This area was divided into 58 rooms. Prior to some recent discoveries from the 1st dynasty, its central burial chamber was considered the oldest masonry structure in the world, being built of quarried limestone. Despite being entered and looted by ancient tomb robbers, the excavators discovered the king's scepter of gold and sard inside the central burial chamber, as well as several beautifully made small stone pots with gold leaf lid coverings, apparently missed by earlier tomb robbers. In fact, Petrie detailed a number of items removed during the excavations of Amélineau. Other items included a tomb stele, flint tools, as well as a variety of copper tools and vessels, stone vessels and pottery vessels filled with grain and fruit. There were also small, glazed objects, carnelian beads, model tools, basketwork and a large quantity of seals.

== Legacy ==
The second half of the 2nd dynasty, especially starting from the reign of Peribsen, the targeted unification of Egypt under a central administration, the development of the economy, trade and culture, created the conditions for the dynamic onset of the 3rd dynasty. This is evidenced by the constructions that were realised, which in their increasingly massive size determined the development of construction technologies and their logistical support, including the necessary administrative structures associated with it. It was also the development of the craft of producing objects, as evidenced by the objects exhibited in museums, partially preserved from the funerary equipment in the tomb of Khasekhemwy. There is no doubt that his sons Netjerikhet, Sekhemkhet, Sanakht and Khaba had enough inspiring ideas for their own reigns.

The era of Khasekhemwy's rule is therefore, in a historical context, an important phase in the development of Egypt's statehood. Increasing Egyptian involvement in neighbouring areas and the imposition of political control over territory beyond Egypt's borders, (Note: Sinai, southern Palestine) are important indicators of growing self-confidence. The intensity of Egypt's foreign relations in the Early Dynastic period is a complex mixture of ideology and practical economics, illuminating some of the problems and priorities faced by Egypt's early rulers.

== Gallery ==
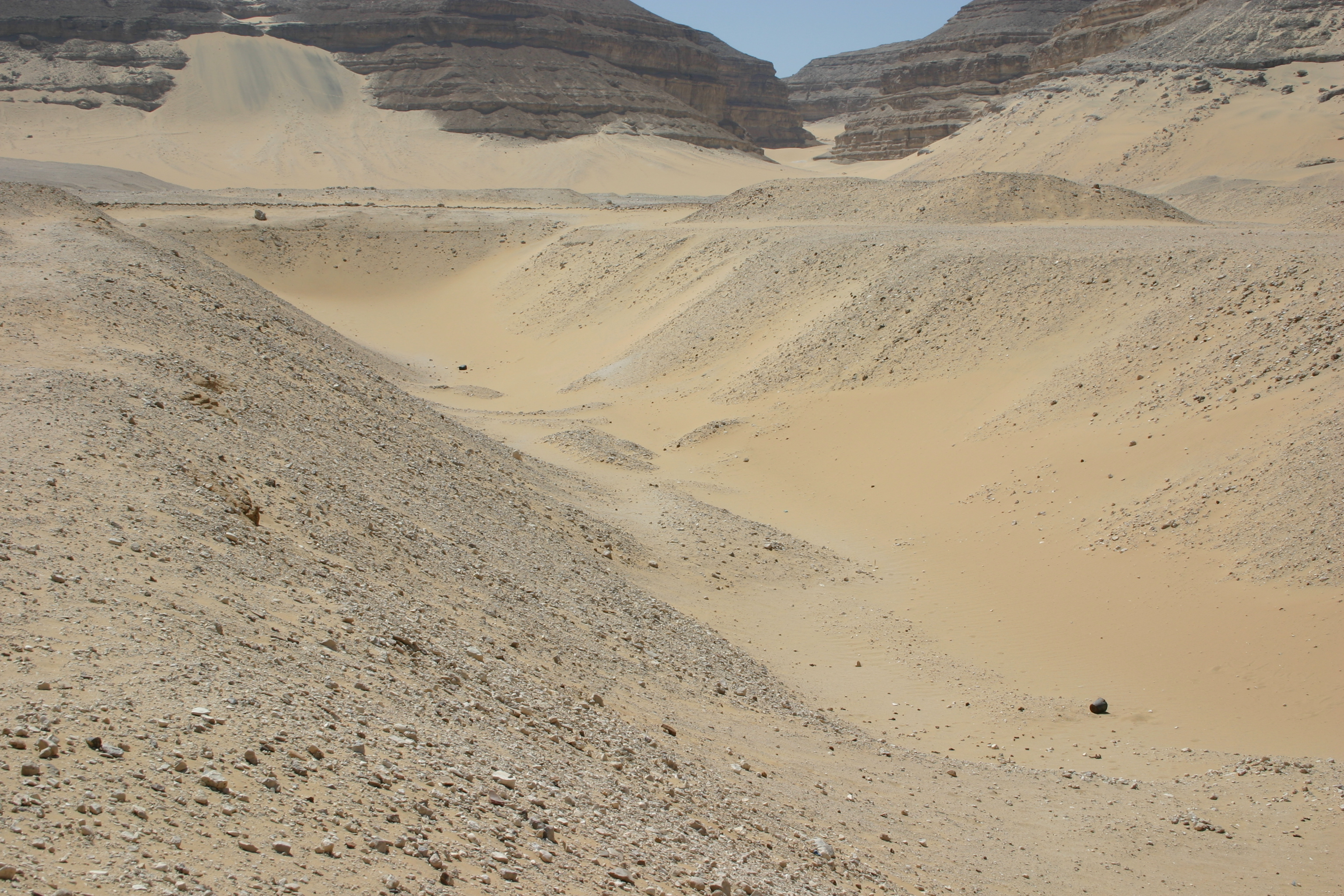
Khasekhemwy's tomb at Umm el-Qa'ab filled with sand

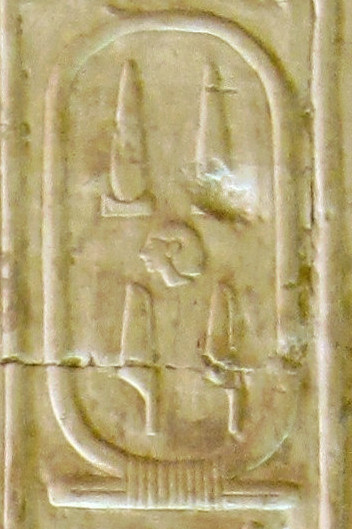
Cartouche 14, Abydos King List. Temple of Seti I, Abydos, Egypt

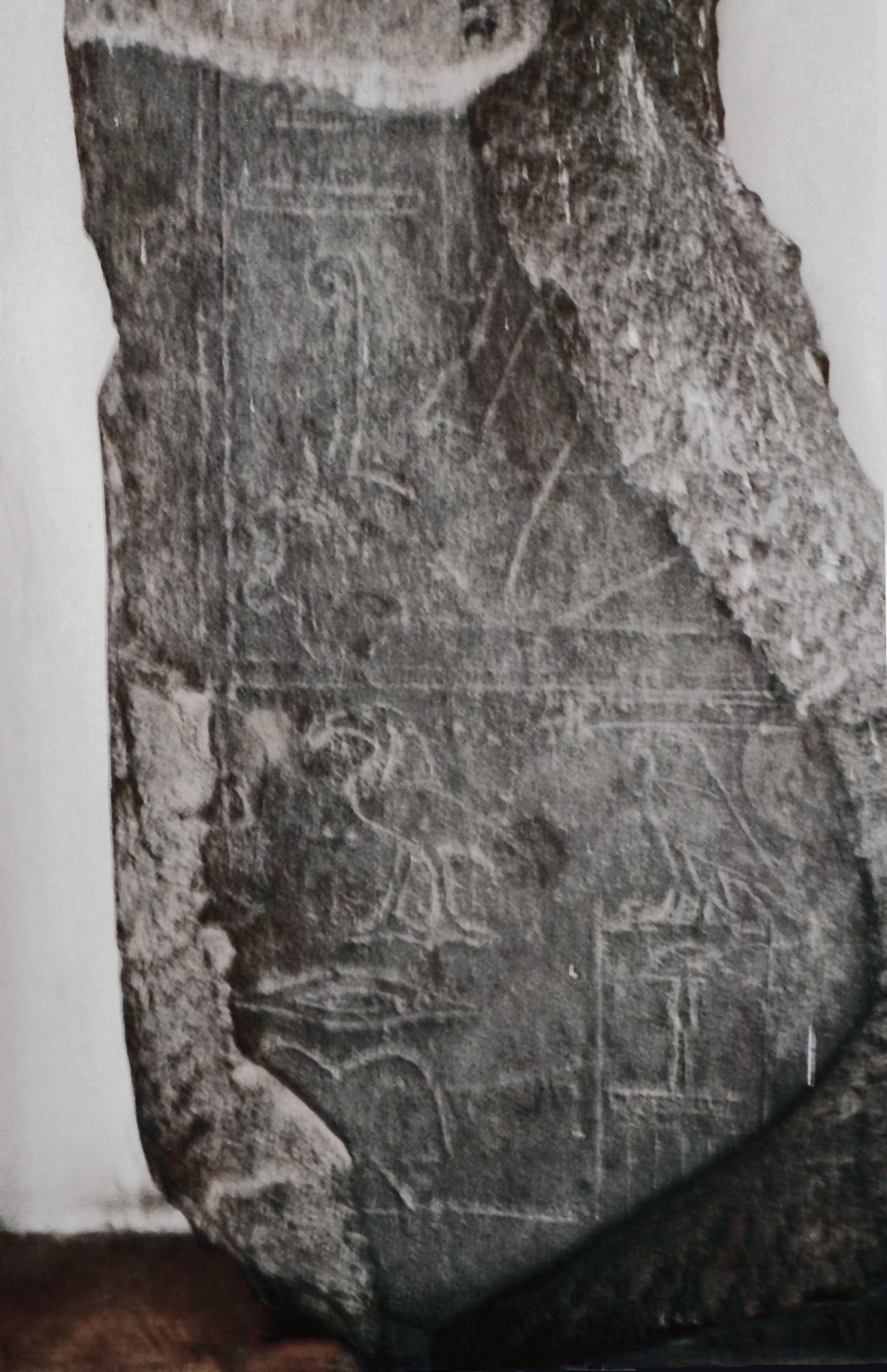
Fragment of a stele of dark greenish quartzite on which Khasekhem, last king of the 2nd dynasty, appears "smiting the foreign lands"

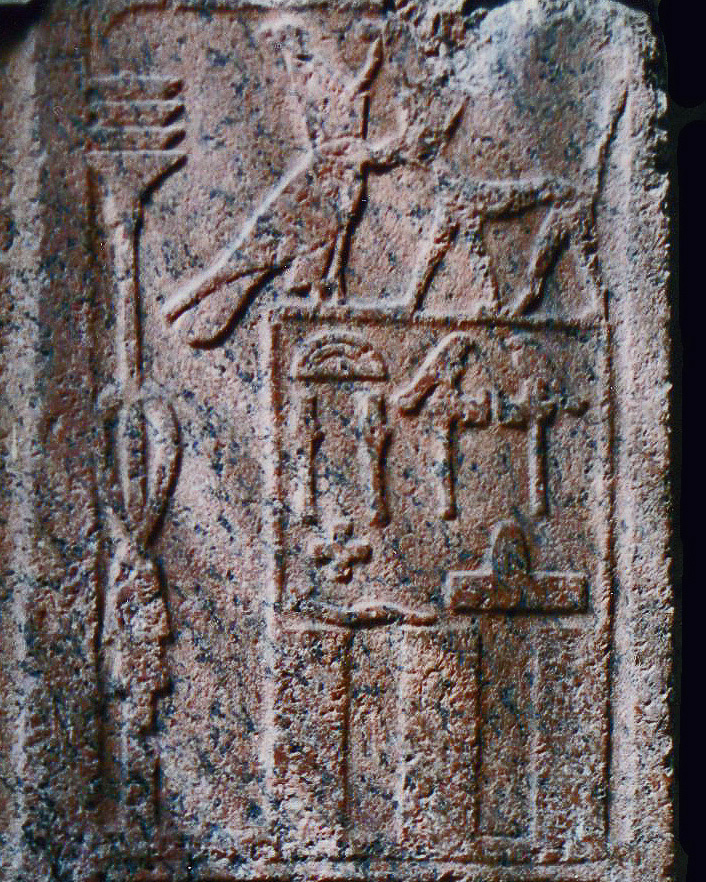
Detail of granite door jamb bearing the Horus and Seth name of Khasekhemwy in Hierakonpolis

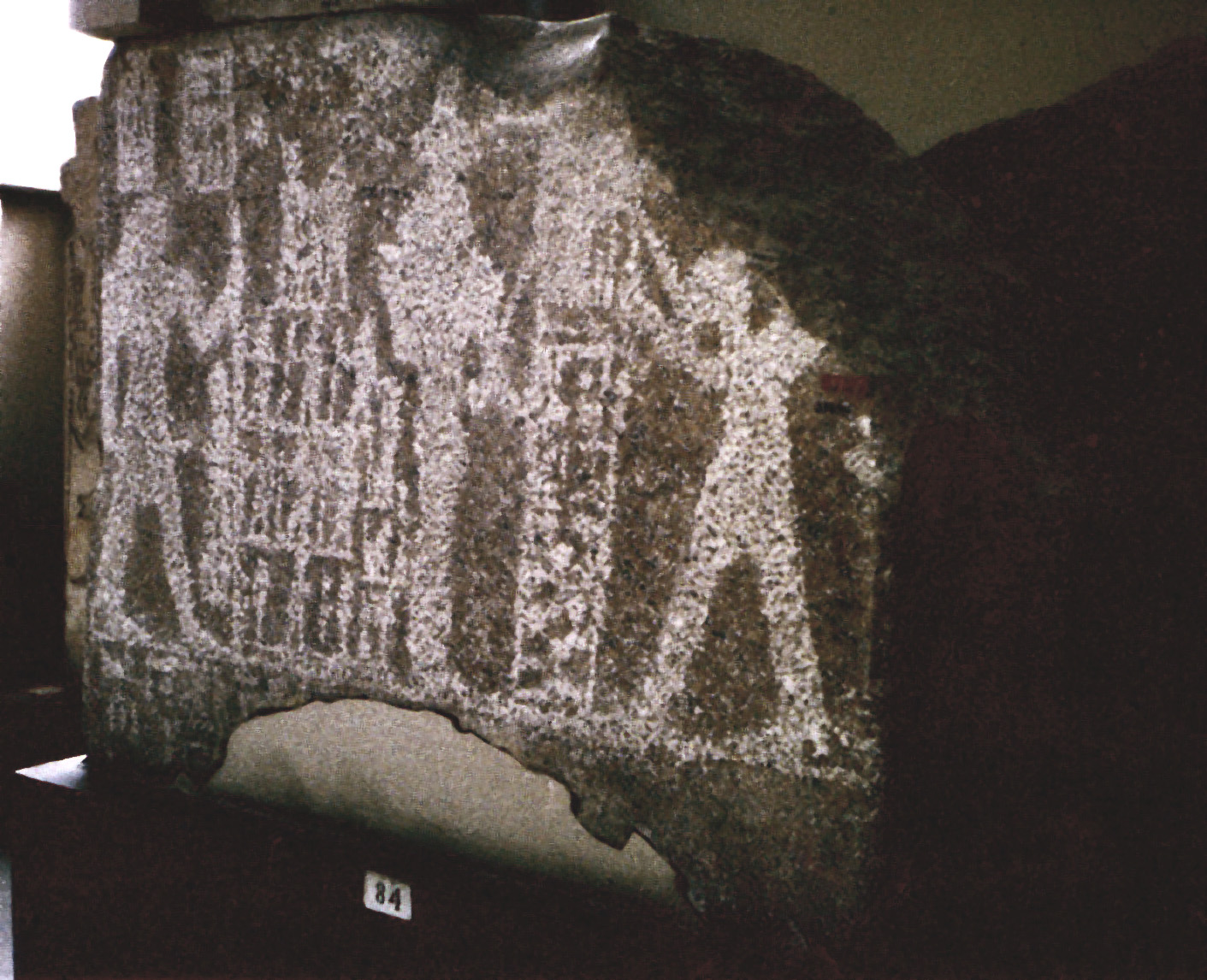
Fragment of a granite door built in the temple of Horus of Hierakonpolis by pharaoh Khasekhemwy and now in the Egyptian Museum

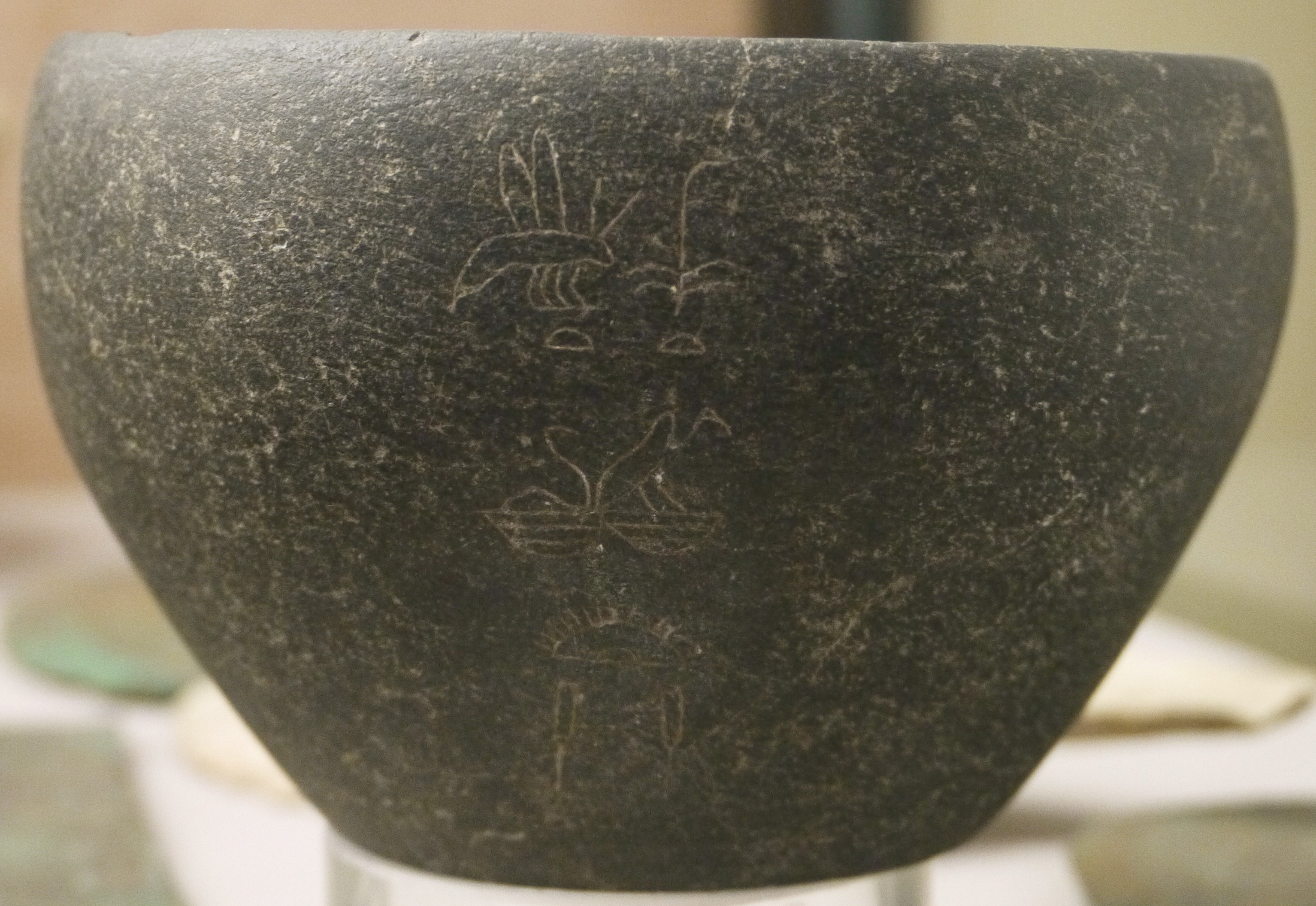
Stone vase bearing Khasekhemwy's titles, National Archaeological Museum, France

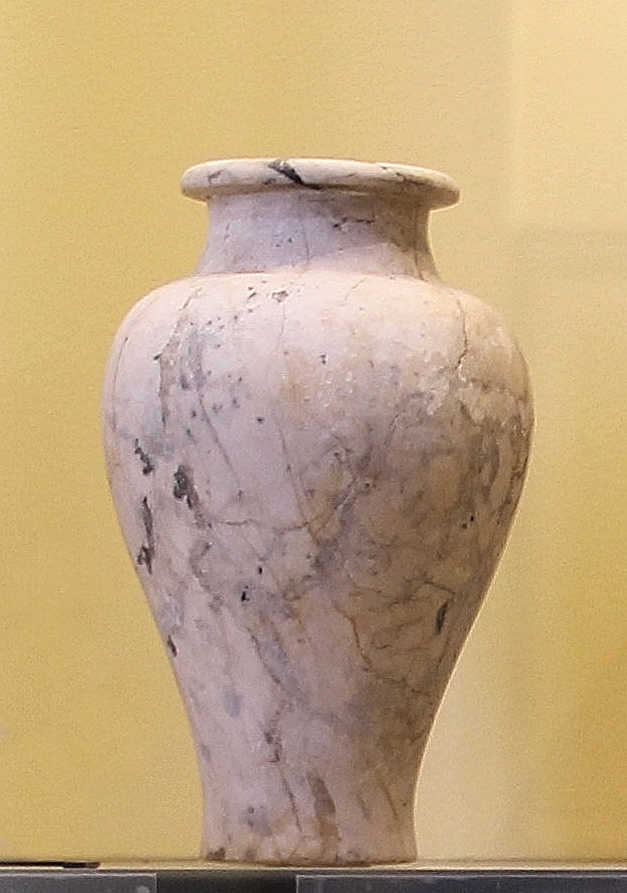
Marble vase from the tomb of Khasekhemwy. Abydos, circa 2700 BCE. Louvre Museum, E 23051

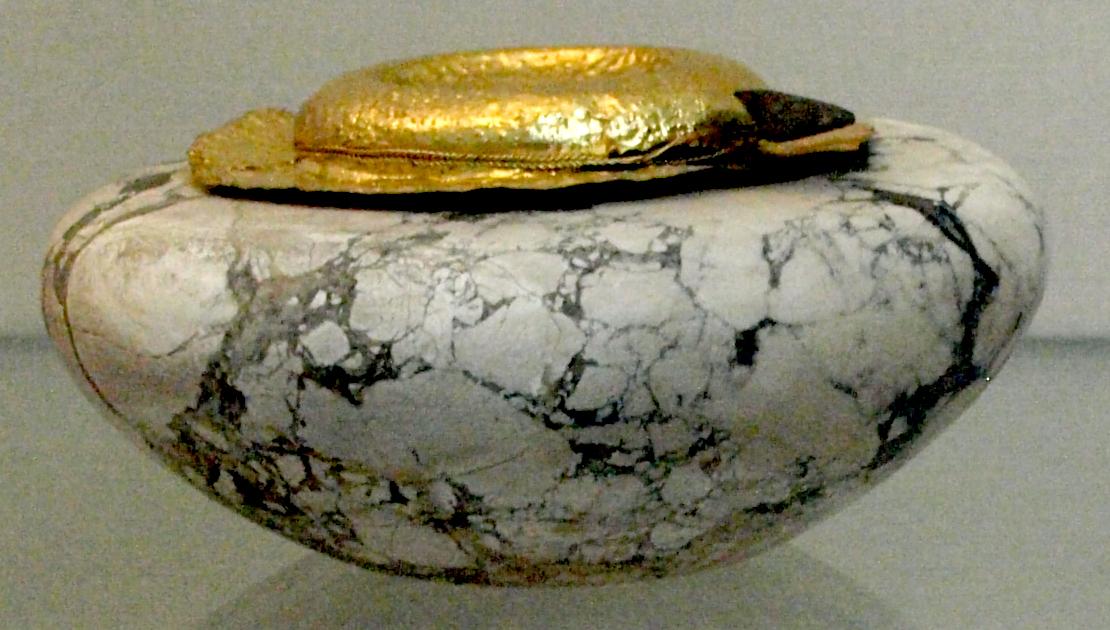
Limestone vessel with gold cover from Khasekhemwy's tomb

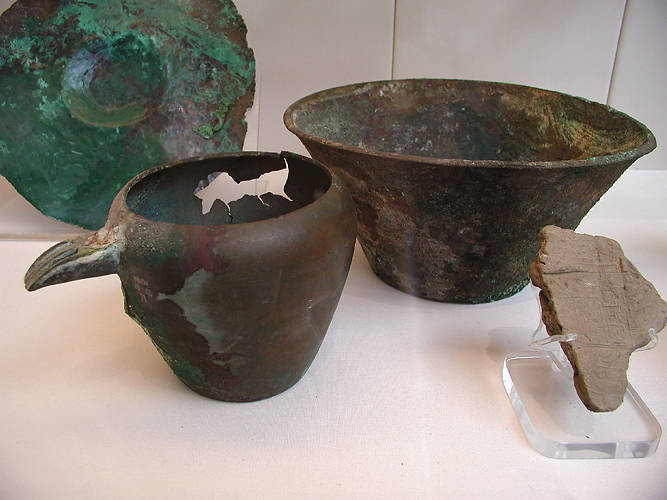
Bronze bowl and ewer from Khasekhemwy's tomb

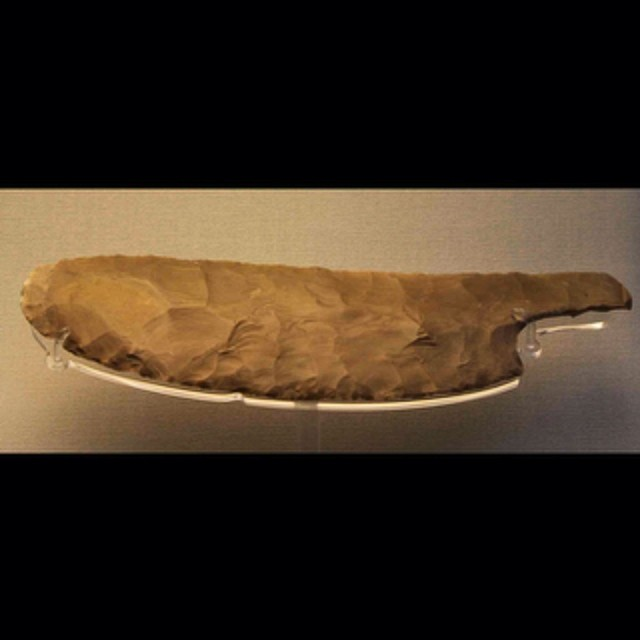
Flint knife from the tomb of Khasekhemwy, Abydos. British Museum

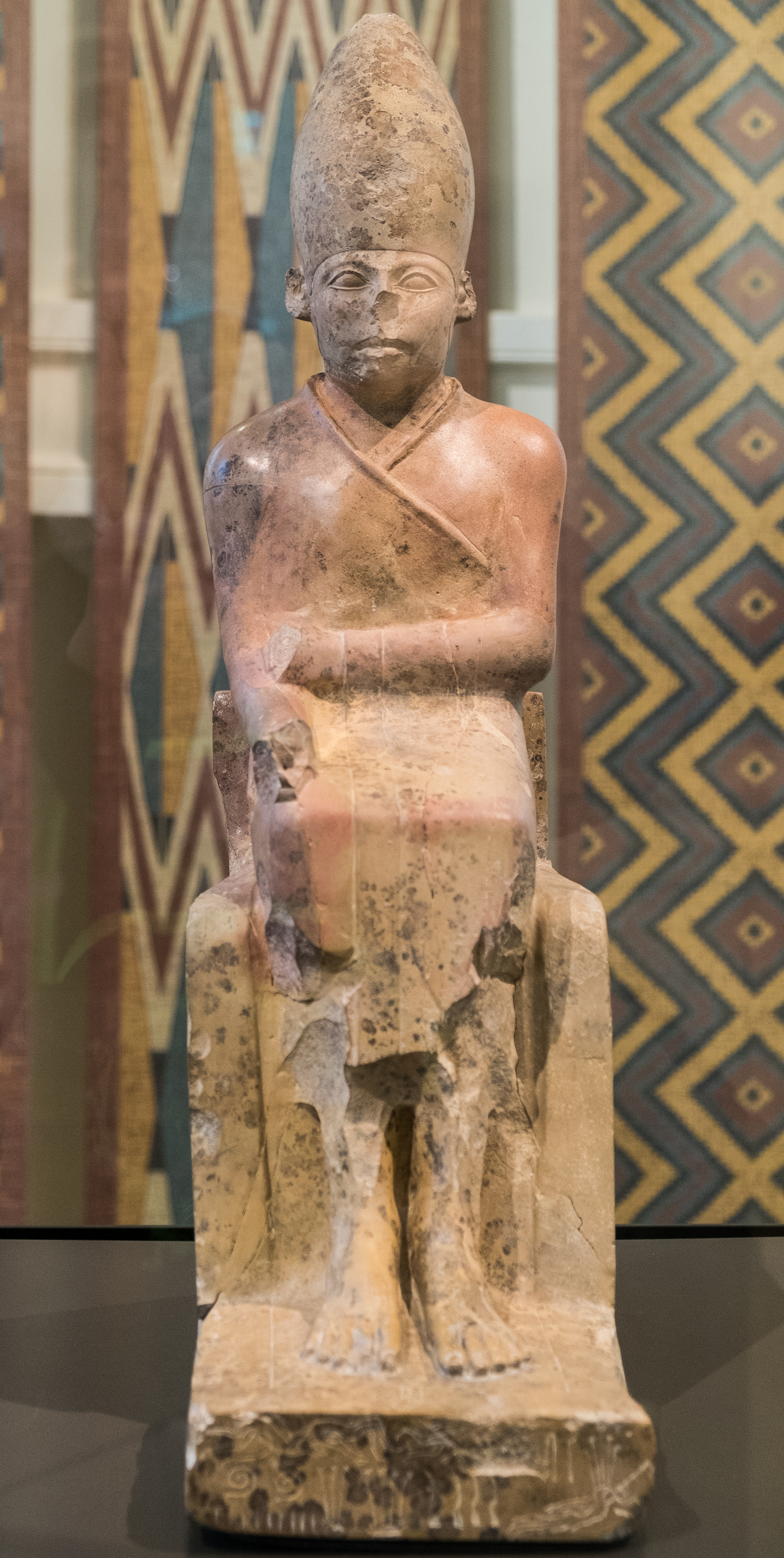
Statue of Khasekhemwy in the Ashmolean Museum

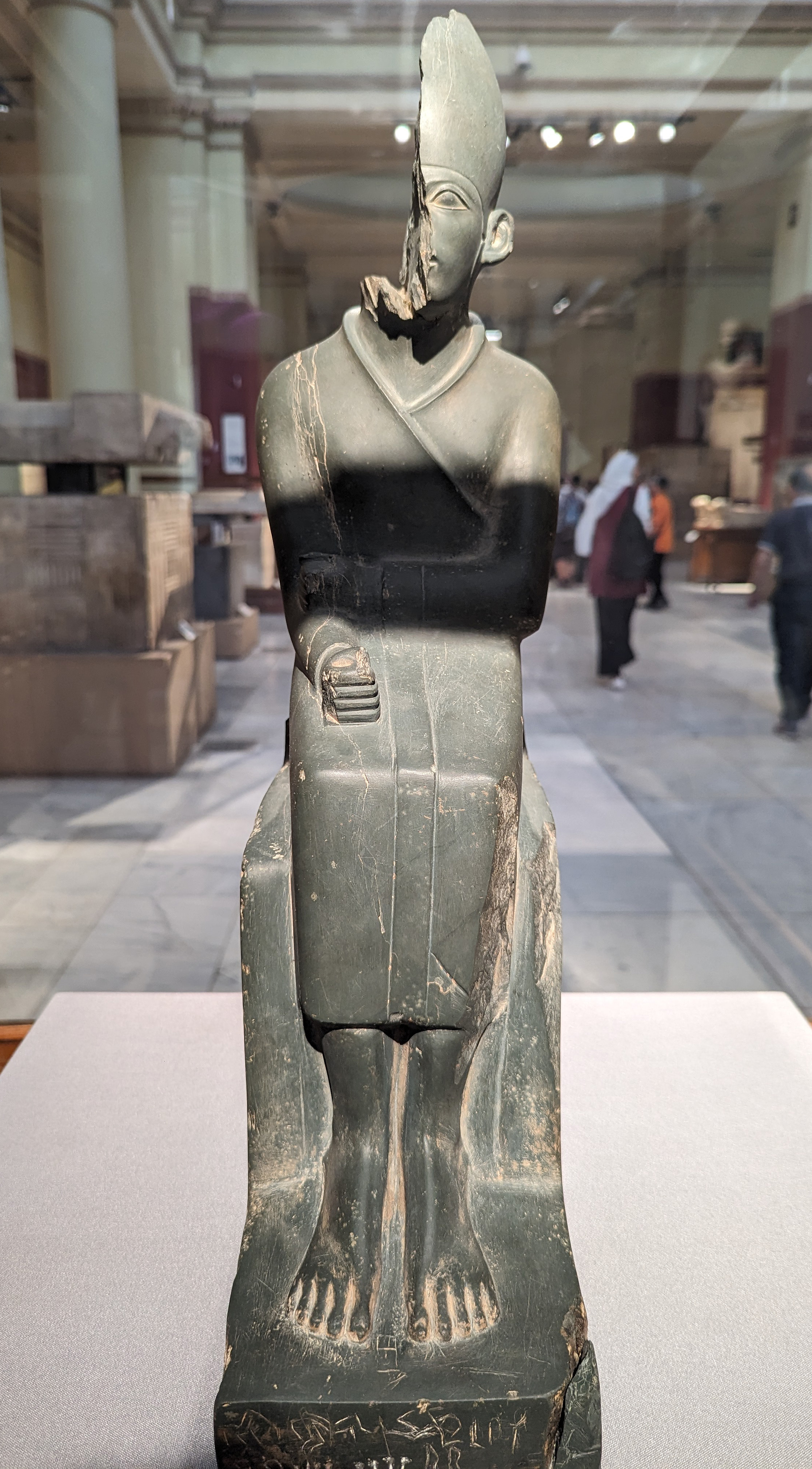
Statue of Khasekhemwy, Egyptian Museum in Cairo

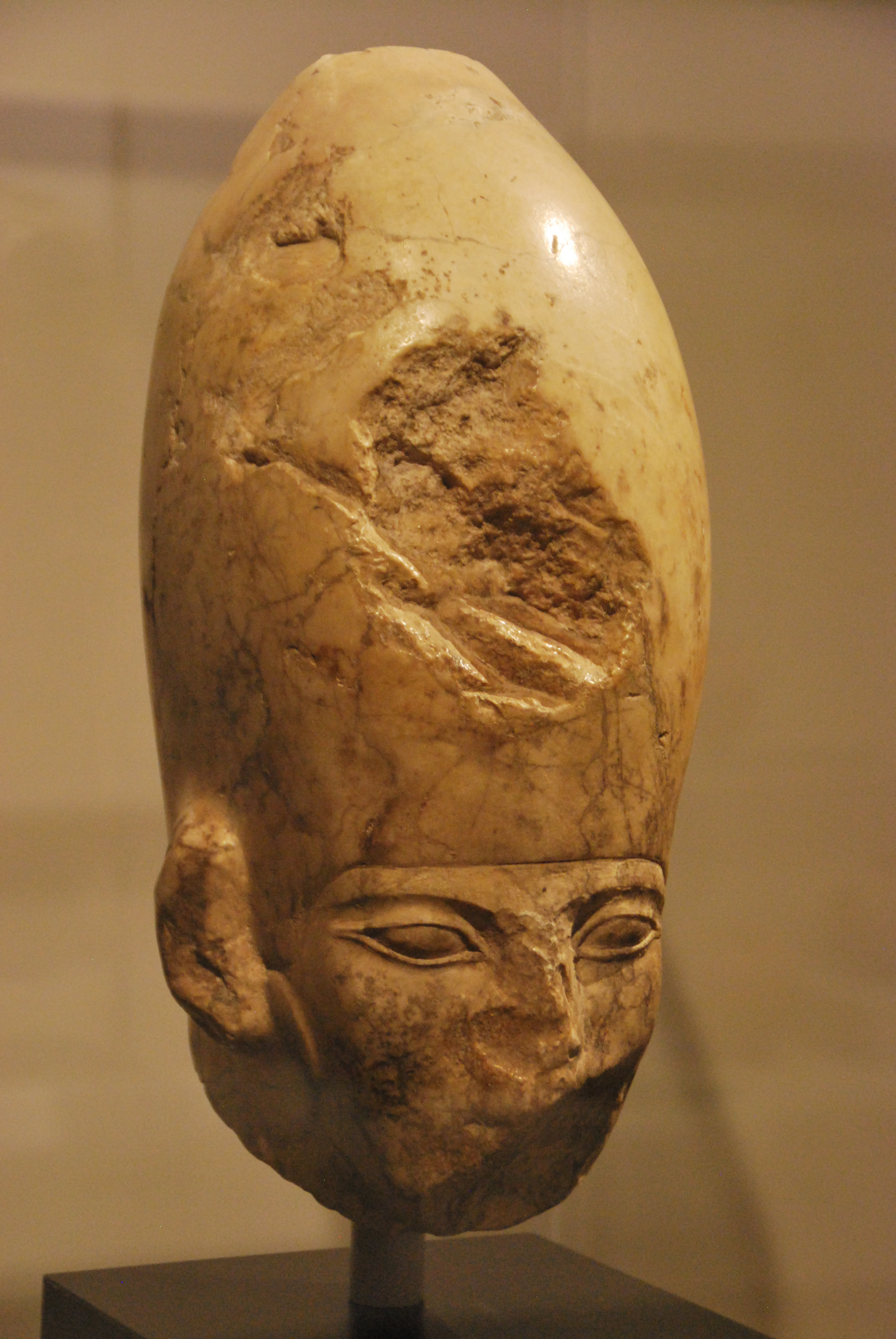
Statue head of Khasekhemwy in the Museum of Fine Arts, Boston

== Bibliography ==
- Toby Wilkinson, Royal Annals of Ancient Egypt: The Palermo Stone and Its Associated Fragments, (Kegan Paul International), 2000.
- Egypt: Khasekhem/Khasekhemwy of Egypt's 2nd dynasty
