= Khaba =

Ancient Egyptian Pharaoh of 3rd dynasty

- Hudjefa II.?, Huzefa II.?, Sedjes?, Huni?
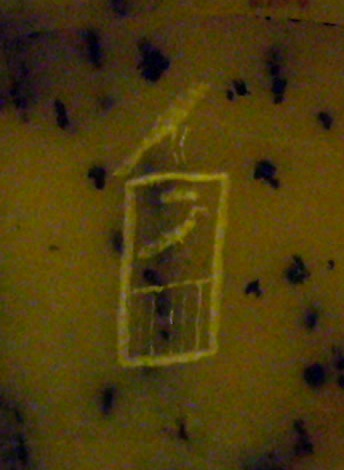
- Serekh of Khaba on a stone bowl of unknown provenance, Petrie Museum of Egyptian Archaeology, UC 15800.

Pharaoh
- Reign: duration unknown; ca. 2670 BC
- Predecessor: Sekhemkhet or Sanakht
- Successor: Huni (if not identical to him), Sanakht, Qahedjet
Royal titulary
Horus name
Hor-Khaba
Ḥr-ḫˁj-b3
The soul of Horus appears
| G5 | N28 G29 |
Golden Horus
Netjer-nub
Nṯr-nwb
Golden falcon
G7 S12
Prenomen
Abydos King List: Sedjes
Sḏṣ
"omitted" or "missing"
< O34 I10 S29 >
Turin King List: Hudjefa
Ḥw-ḏf3
"erased" or "missing"
< V28 I10 I9 G1 G41 G37 >
- Father: Khasekhemwy ?
- Mother: Nimaathap ?
- Burial: Layer Pyramid at Zawyet el'Aryan
- Monuments: Layer Pyramid
- Dynasty: Later 3rd Dynasty

Khaba (also read as Hor-Khaba) was a pharaoh of Ancient Egypt, active during the 3rd Dynasty of the Old Kingdom period. The exact time during which Khaba ruled is unknown but may have been around 2670 BC, and almost definitely towards the end of the dynasty.

King Khaba is considered to be difficult to assess as a figure of ancient Egypt. His name is archaeologically well-attested by stone bowls and mud seal impressions. Khaba's reign is securely dated to the Third Dynasty. Because of the contradictions within Ramesside king lists and the lack of contemporary, festive inscriptions, his exact chronological position within the dynasty remains disputed. These problems originate in part from contradictory king lists, which were all compiled long after Khaba's death, especially during the Ramesside era (which is separated from the Third Dynasty by 1,400 years). It is also a matter of debate as to where Khaba might have been buried. Many Egyptologists and archaeologists propose that an unfinished Layer Pyramid at Zawyet el'Aryan belongs to him. Others believe instead that his tomb is a large mastaba close to the Layer Pyramid, where numerous stone vessels bearing Khaba's serekh have been found.

== Attestations ==
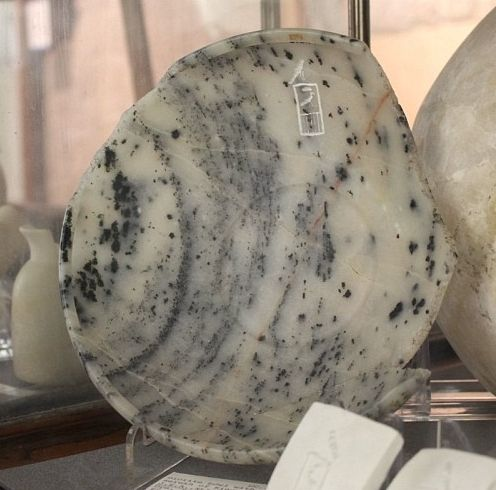
Diorite bowl with the serekh or royal name of Khaba

Khaba's name appears on nine polished stone bowls, variously made of magnesite, travertine, and diorite, which were found at the archaeological locales of Zawyet el'Aryan, Abusir, and Naga-ed-Deir. The bowls were found mostly intact; they show only the king's serekh name on their polished surfaces. As was conventional at the time they were made, they contain no additional inscriptions for context.

His name also appears on several mud seal impressions found at Quesna (in the Delta), Zawyet el'Aryan, Hierakonpolis, and Elephantine. Most of the mud seals were excavated at modern-day Elephantine; it is possible that more of them lie under the garden of the current museum of Elephantine. These seal impressions bear more inscriptions than the stone bowls, however most of the seals are only preserved as small fragments and their surfaces have been roughened over the years.

Only one seal bears a well-preserved complete row of names or titles; the seal, numbered UC-11755, is undated and is now on display in the Petrie Museum, London. The inscription alternates between Horus and Golden Horus names.

== Identity ==
=== Royal name ===
Khaba is known by his serekh and Golden Horus name only. His Nisut-Bity title and his Nebty name are unknown. Additionally, Khaba is one of the very few kings from Early Dynastic and Old Kingdom times with an archaeologically proven Gold name, a likely predecessor to the Golden Horus name, which Khaba may also have introduced. Aside from Khaba, the only kings with Gold names who lived before king Sneferu, founder of the 4th dynasty, were Djer, Den, Nynetjer, Khasekhemwy, and Djoser. From Snefru onward, the Golden Horus name became a fixed royal title to any ruling king, no matter how long the king ruled. Khaba's Golden Horus name can be found on several seal impressions, although its correct reading and translation are disputed. Peter Kaplony interprets it as Nub-iret or Nub iret-djedef, though he is unsure whether the syllable djedef was an inherent part of the name or an additional honorary title. Thomas Schneider and Jürgen von Beckerath, in contrast, see Khaba's Golden Horus as Netjer-nub, which means "golden falcon". Khaba's Gold name is the first to show the infinitive form of the royal Gold name.

=== Identification with Ramesside kinglists ===
Scholars face several problems in attempting to connect Khaba to royal names known from the Ramesside era (the Nineteenth and Twentieth Dynasties). Unfortunately, these lists offer no clear consensus about the number or names of the kings of the 3rd dynasty. The Abydos king list gives Nebka, Djoser, Teti, Sedjes, and Neferkarê, while the Turin Canon offers Nebka, Djoser, Djoserteti, Hudjefa, and Huni. The kinglist of Saqqara lists Djoser, Djoserteti, Nebkarê, and Huni. The ancient historian Manetho gives nine names: Necheróphes, Tosorthrós, Týreis, Mesôchris, Sôÿphis, Tósertasis, Achês, Sêphuris, and Kerpherês. Egyptologist Iorwerth Eiddon Stephen Edwards, for example, identifies Khaba with the Ramesside cartouche name Teti.

In contrast, Egyptologists Wolfgang Helck and Aidan Dodson suggest that Khaba could have been identical to the Ramesside names Sedjes and Hudjefa II. Both "names" are actually pseudonyms for a royal title that was illegible when the Ramesside scribes compiled the kinglists. This would match a king who ruled only a short time. The Turin Canon gives a short reign of 6 years for Hudjefa II.

A minority of modern Egyptologists think that Khaba might be identical to a Ramesside cartouche name known as Huni. This name can be credited to a king who is handed down by the Ramesside scribes as the last ruler of the 3rd dynasty. Rainer Stadelmann, Nicolas Grimal, Wolfgang Helck, and Toby Wilkinson point to a step pyramid at Zawyet el'Aryan, called the Layer Pyramid. This monument is assigned to Khaba (see section below) and since Stadelmann and Wilkinson hold that the pyramid was finished, they believe that a long-reigning king, such as king Huni, would have been necessary to oversee the project. Huni is attested in the Turin Canon to have reigned for 24 years. In addition, Stadelmann points to the seal impressions found at Elephantine: they come from a site very close to a stepped pyramid which is said to have been built by Huni.

=== Identification with Manetho's king list ===
It is also unknown under which Hellenized name the ancient historian Manetho listed Khaba. He might have been the same person as the listed Mesôchris or Sôÿphis, but this in turn is doubted by Wolfgang Helck and Eberhard Otto. They connect both names with king Sanakht.

== Reign ==
=== Chronology ===
Because of the contradictions within Ramesside king lists and the lack of contemporary, festive inscriptions, the exact chronological position of Khaba remains disputed. Egyptologist Nabil Swelim believes that Khaba could have been the direct successor to King Khasekhemwy, the last ruler of the 2nd dynasty. He bases his assumptions on similarities between the two's names: both begin with the syllable kha. As a comparison, he points to the names Netjerikhet (Djoser) and Sekhemkhet (Djoserteti), which also display such similarity and are widely assumed to have ruled back-to-back.

Nevertheless, Swelim's theory is not widely accepted. Grimal, Helck, Wilkinson and Stadelmann point out that during the 3rd dynasty it became a fashion that royal stone bowls with polished surfaces showed only Horus names, without any guiding inscriptions. This is also the case for the stone bowls of king Khaba. This decor style was practiced still under Sneferu, the founder of the 4th dynasty. Thus, Khaba is thought to have reigned close to the end of the Third Dynasty.

=== Duration ===
The correct duration of Khaba's reign is also unknown. Should he be identical to the Ramesside cartouche names Sedjes (meaning "omitted") and Hudjefa (meaning "erased"), he might have ruled for six years, as the Turin Canon suggests. If Khaba was identical to king Huni, he might have ruled for 24 years.

=== Events ===
The current archaeological situation allows no closer evaluation of Khaba's reign. The seal impressions from Elephantine only prove that this island seems to have been an important place to visit in Khaba's time. The inscriptions reveal that the seals and their belonging vessels originated from Thinis and that they were registered by the governor of Elephantine. Other seals show the depiction of the goddess Bastet. The Hierakonpolis seal was found in early dynastic ruins of a local Horus temple. It shows traces of the image of a god, possibly Ash.

== Tomb ==
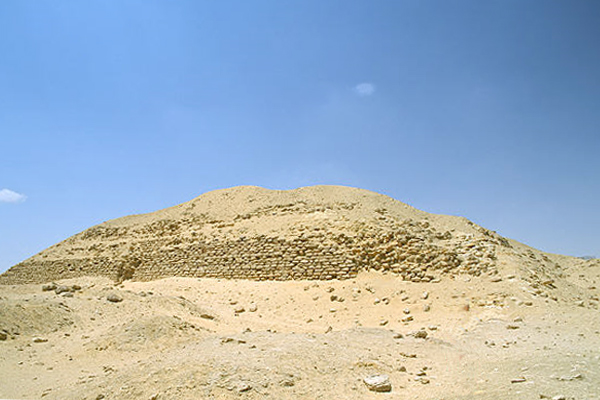
Layer Pyramid at Zawyet el'Aryan.

Khaba is commonly thought to have built the Layer Pyramid, located at Zawyet el'Aryan, about 8 km south-west of Giza. The pyramid's construction is typical of Third Dynasty masonry with mudbricks arranged in layers around a core made of rough blocks from the local bedrock. The pyramid was planned to be about 42 to 45 metres (138 to 148 ft) tall, but is now only 17 metres (56 ft). It is unclear whether part of the pyramid has been eroded over time or its construction was never finished. While there are no inscriptions directly relating the pyramid to Khaba, his serekh appears on stone bowls that were discovered in a nearby mastaba, known as Mastaba Z500.

Alternatively, Khaba could have been interred in the aforementioned mastaba, which is located about 200 m (660 ft) north of the pyramid. Indeed, excavations of the mastaba yielded several stone bowls inscribed with Khaba's Horus name as well as two seal fragments of him. Although this is generally taken as a proof that Khaba was the pyramid owner, it could equally imply that the mastaba was Khaba's tomb and the pyramid that of another, yet unknown king.

== Other buildings from Khaba's reign ==
=== Mastaba Z500 ===
Only two large mastaba tombs can be securely dated into Khaba's reign. The first one is known as Mastaba Z500, which is located at Zawyet el'Aryan. It lies around 200m north of the Layer Pyramid and has a south–north-orientation. The mastaba is made of mudbricks, its outer wall is niched and it contains only two large chambers without any typical tomb architecture elements. Because of this, Egyptologists such as Nabil Swelim believe that Mastaba Z500 was in fact a mortuary temple, belonging to the funerary complex of the Layer Pyramid. The datation of the building into Khaba's reign is based on numerous diorite and dolomite vessels and mud seal fragments, bearing the serekh name of king Khaba.

=== Quesna Tomb ===
In 2010, an unknown mudbrick mastaba was discovered in Quesna, an archaeological site located in the Monufia Governorate (in the Nile Delta). The mastaba was once 14m in length and 6m in width. Its substructure contains a 3m wide corridor chapel, divided into three architectural sections: the first (northern) section is filled with rubble, the second (central) section contains a double room as the burial chamber and the third (southern) section has a burial shaft in its center. In 2014, a tiny mud seal fragment with the king's name was discovered inside. The true owner of the tomb, however, is unknown and archaeological excavations are still on-going.
