= Heqet =

Ancient Egyptian goddess of fertility

Name in hieroglyphs
H q t I7
- Animals: Frog
- Gender: Female
- Consort: Khnum, Ra (in Kom Ombo)
- Offspring: Heru-ur (in Kom Ombo)

Heqet (Egyptian ḥqt, also ḥqtyt "Heqtit"), sometimes spelled Heket, is an Egyptian goddess of fertility, identified with Hathor, represented in the form of a frog.

To the Egyptians, the frog was an ancient symbol of fertility, related to the annual flooding of the Nile. Heqet was originally the female counterpart of Khnum, or the wife of Khnum, and eventually she also became the mother of Heru-ur. It has been proposed that her name is the origin of the name of Hecate, the Greek goddess of witchcraft.

== Name ==
The name is written as ḥqt with the determinative "frog" (I7). The phonetic spelling may use the biliteral ḥq hieroglyph (S38) in place of uniliteral ḥ (V28). The alternative form ḥqtyt adds an explicit feminine ending, used alongside the "egg" determinative (H8) to emphasize the deity's femininity. The Middle Egyptian pronunciation of the name may have been close to /ħaˈqaːtat/, which has been proposed (among other possibilities) as the origin of the name of Greek Hecate (Ἑκάτη).

== Worship ==
The beginning of her cult dates to the Early Dynastic Period at least. Her name was part of the names of some high-born Second Dynasty individuals buried at Helwan, such as prince Nisuheqet, and was mentioned on a stela of Wepemnofret and in the Pyramid Texts. Early frog statuettes are often thought to be depictions of her.

Heqet was considered the wife of Khnum, who formed the bodies of new children on his potter's wheel.

In the Osiris myth, it was Heqet who breathed life into the new body of Horus at birth, as she was a goddess of the last moments of birth. As the birth of Horus became more intimately associated with the resurrection of Osiris, so Heqet's role became one more closely associated with resurrection. Eventually, this association led to her amulets gaining the phrase I am the resurrection in the Christian era along with cross and lamb symbolism.

A temple dedicated to Horus and Heqet dating to the Ptolemaic Period was found at Qus.

As a fertility goddess, associated explicitly with the last stages of the flooding of the Nile, and so with the germination of corn, she became associated with the final stages of childbirth. This association, which appears to have arisen during the Middle Kingdom, gained her the title She who hastens the birth (cf. the role of Heqet in the story of The Birth of the Royal Children from the Westcar Papyrus). Frog amulets representing Heqet were probably worn by women during childbirth to ensure an easy delivery.

== Gallery ==
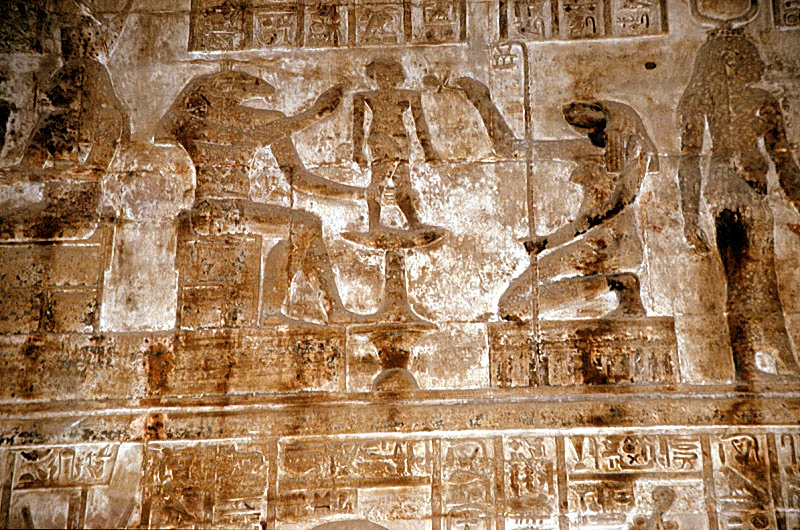
The god Khnum, accompanied by Heqet, moulds Ihy in a relief from the mammisi (birth temple) at Dendera Temple complex

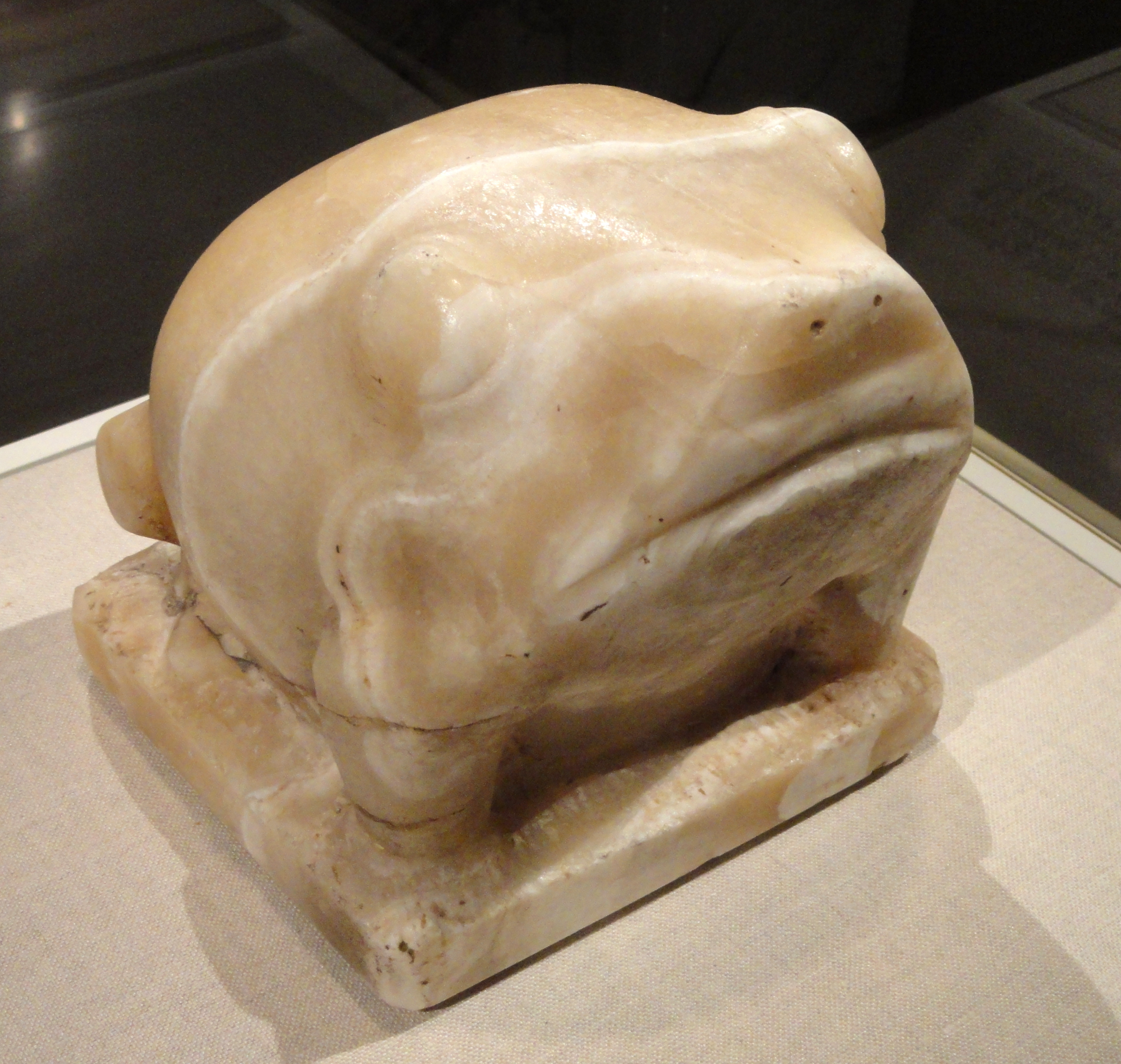
Early Dynastic Period (c. 3000 BC) frog statuette (Cleveland Museum of Art)

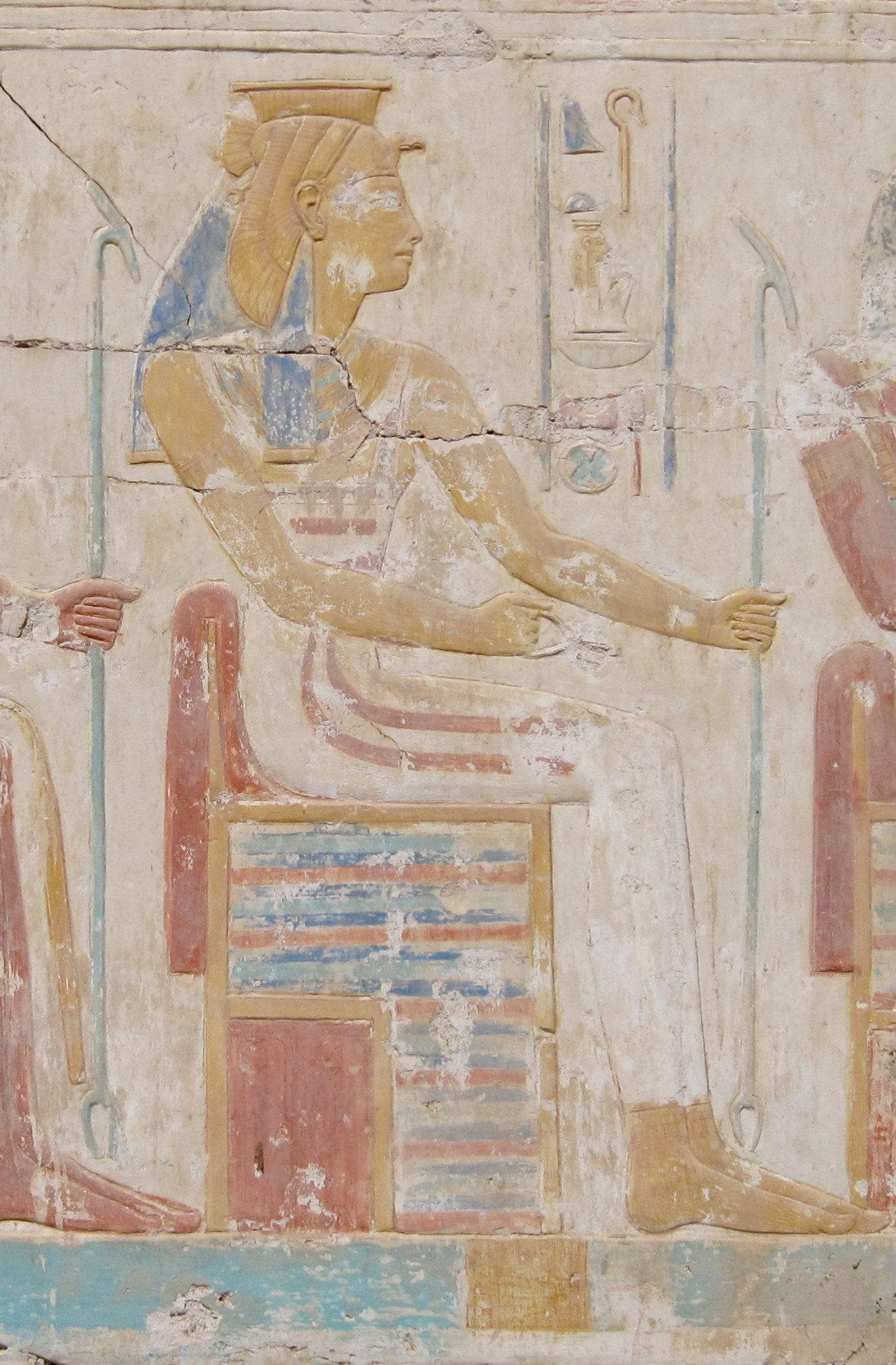
Heqet in a fully humanoid form, Ramesses II temple, Abydos, Egypt
