= Layer Pyramid =

Step Pyramid of 3rd dynasty

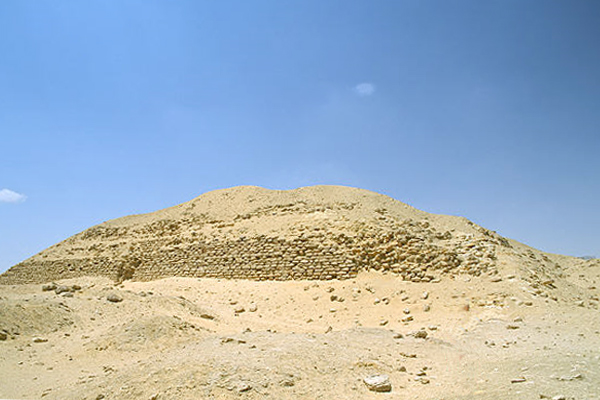
- The ruins of the layer pyramid
- Interactive map of Layer Pyramid
- 29.932820°N 31.161262°E
- Owner: Owner uncertain, possibly Khaba, 3rd Dynasty
- Constructed: c. 2630 BC
- Type: Step Pyramid (planned to comprise 5 steps)
- Material: natural bedrock and mudbricks
- Height: planned to be 42–45 m (138–148 ft), today 17 m (56 ft)
- Base: 84 m (276 ft)
- Slope: 68°

The Layer Pyramid (known locally in Arabic as el haram el midawwar, Arabic: الهرم المدور, meaning 'rubble-hill pyramid') is a ruined step pyramid dating to the 3rd Dynasty of Egypt (2686 BC to 2613 BC) and located in the necropolis of Zawyet El Aryan. Its ownership is uncertain and may be attributable to pharaoh Khaba. The pyramid architecture, however, is very similar to that of the Buried Pyramid of king Sekhemkhet and for this reason is firmly datable to the 3rd Dynasty.

The pyramid was excavated at the beginning of the 20th century by two different teams who reported conflicting estimates regarding its size and number of subterranean chambers. No artefacts were found over the course of the excavations, and no trace of a burial could be found. For this reason, it is unclear whether the pyramid was used to bury a pharaoh or was abandoned following the premature death of the king.

At the time of its construction the pyramid was surrounded by a necropolis housing large mastabas belonging to the high officials of the 3rd Dynasty state. A mortuary temple was built on the eastern side of the pyramid and a valley temple was possibly located several hundred metres from it. Nowadays, the pyramid is located within the confines of a restricted military area, barring modern excavations of the site.

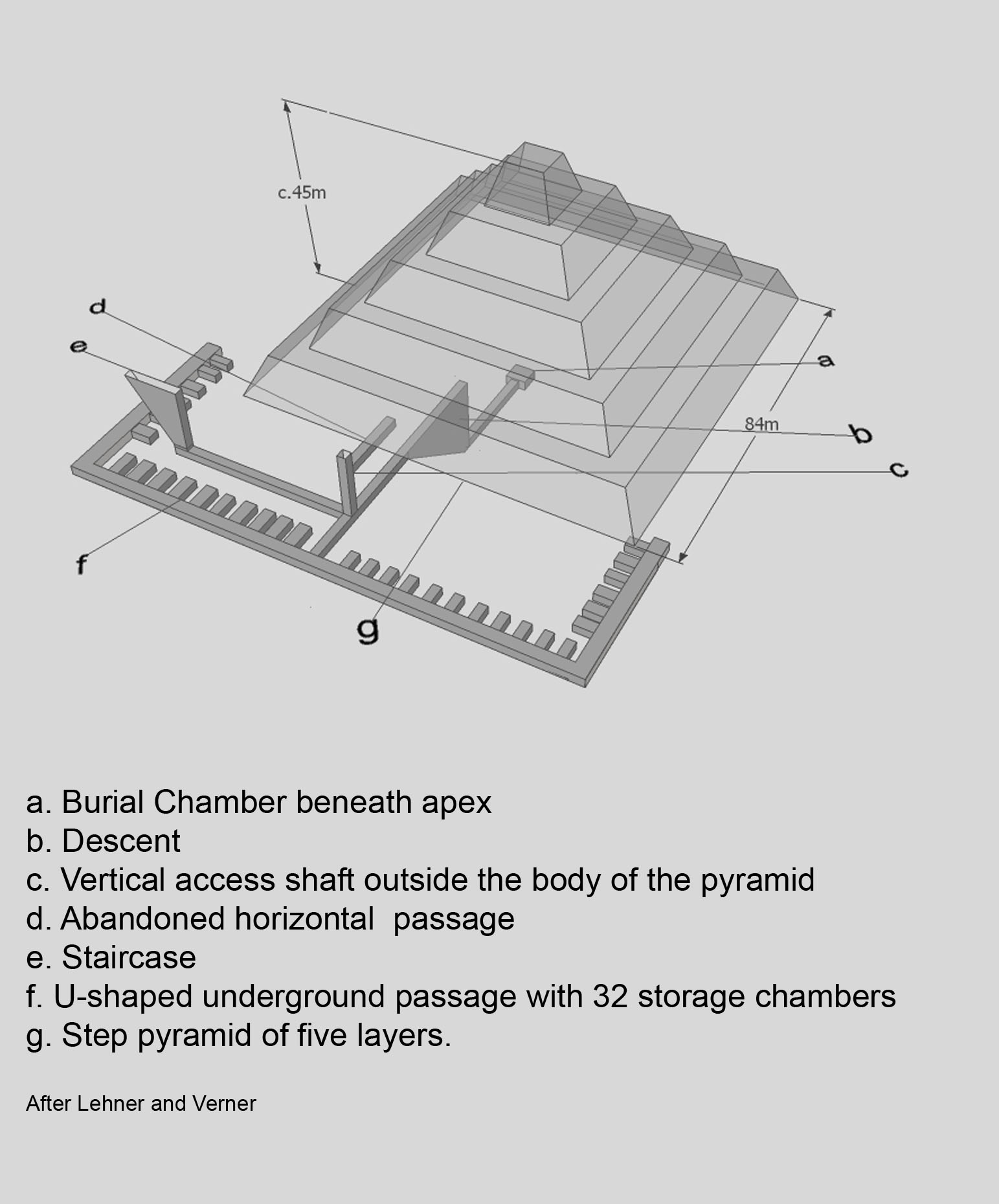
Plan of the Layer Pyramid

== Research history ==
The Layer Pyramid was first examined and its surroundings explored in 1839 by John Shae Perring. Soon after, in 1848, the pyramid was identified as such by Karl Richard Lepsius, who listed it as number XIV in his pioneering list of pyramids. Around 40 years later, in 1886, Gaston Maspero unsuccessfully searched for the entrance of the subterranean passages of the pyramid, which was discovered in 1896 by Jacques de Morgan. The latter undertook excavations of the pyramid but stopped after clearing the first few steps of the descending stairway.

Further investigations were then performed in 1900 by Alessandro Barsanti, who uncovered the vertical access shaft leading to the burial chamber. Barsanti, seeing that several corridors and chambers were seemingly unfinished and that all were completely devoid of artefacts, deemed that the pyramid had never been used. Shortly after, in 1910–1911, George Reisner and Clarence S. Fisher worked on the site, excavating the north and east exteriors of the pyramid as well as the cemeteries surrounding it. The dimensions of the pyramid as estimated by Barsanti, Reisner and Fisher differ greatly and even the numbers of subterranean galleries they report are in disagreement. The pyramid lies within a restricted military area since 1970 and consequently no excavation has been undertaken there since Reisner and Fisher's superficial work, leaving the structures beneath the pyramid in doubt. Furthermore, the pyramid is now sanded up, hampering modern estimations of its dimensions.

== Description ==
=== Location ===
The Layer Pyramid lies close to the necropolis of Zawyet El Aryan, 8 km (5.0 mi) south-west of Giza and 7 km (4.3 mi) north of Saqqara. The main structure is located on a rock ridge just above the floodplain.

=== Superstructure ===
The Layer Pyramid has a square base whose side is about 84 m (276 ft) long, slightly smaller than the step pyramids of Djoser and Sekhemket. Based on the dimensions of the pyramid of Djoser, the egyptologist Jean-Philippe Lauer estimated that the layer pyramid was originally planned to comprise five steps and would have reached c. 42–45 m (138–148 ft) in height. Today, only two of these steps remain, reaching a height of about 17 m (56 ft). The current ruined state of the pyramid allows a view of its core, which is an 11 m^{2} (120 sq ft) pyramidal mound made of poor quality rough stone blocks taken from the local bedrock. This core is surrounded by a 2.6 m (8.5 ft) thick casing of the same masonry. This is in turn surrounded by 14 layers of mud bricks bonded with clay mortar and disposed almost vertically, with an inward inclination angle of 68°. Just as the inner-most stone casing of the pyramid core, each mud brick layer is 2.6 m (8.5 ft) thick.

Whether the pyramid was finished or left unfinished is disputed among experts. The egyptologist Rainer Stadelmann believes that the pyramid was indeed finished, but others, such as Miroslav Verner, think that the building was left unfinished because of the pharaoh's premature death. In particular, no traces of outer cladding were found, which could hint that there never was one because the pyramid was not completed.

Mud bricks were found at the base of the pyramid, which are not associated with the pyramid itself, but are interpreted as remnants of a construction ramp.

=== Substructure ===
Section of the pyramid, showing the substructures

The disposition of the substructures of the layer pyramid is extremely similar to that found in the Buried Pyramid of Sekhemket. Consequently, Mark Lehner and others suggest that the two pyramids must have been constructed very close in time.

The entrance to the subterranean structures lies on the east, a disposition which would be unparalleled until the construction of the pyramid of Senusret II, almost 1000 years later. The egyptologists Vito Maraglioglio and Celeste Rinaldi proposed that this unique feature was chosen by the Egyptian architects in order to free the north side of the pyramid for the construction of a temple. Aidan Dodson showed however that in this situation, the pyramid construction ramp would have "impinged on any northern temple construction even more damagingly". Rather, he explains this unique eastern entrance as resulting from a desire by the architects to allow for easy access to the pyramid store rooms, located immediately beneath the eastern entrance.

The entrance immediately leads to a 36 m (118 ft) long steep stairway and then down on to a corridor which heads west. The corridor ends in a straight vertical shaft, at the top of which is the so-called upper corridor, an unfinished passage which goes south toward the center of the pyramid. At the bottom of the shaft is a T-shaped crossway. To the left, this crossway leads south to the lower corridor, half-way of which is a narrow stairway, so narrow that a sarcophagus could hardly have been passed through it. The lower corridor then finishes in the king's burial chamber. In this area of the stairway, Barsanti drew another gallery leading above the burial chamber, but this gallery is absent in Reisner's and Fisher's notes. To the right of the T-shaped crossway is a U-shaped gallery system. The ground plan of the gallery system resembles that of a comb, comprising rows of chambers, totalling 32, which were possibly destined to be storage rooms for the gravegoods. The gallery proved to be "clean and empty, as if the workmen had only left".

The king's burial chamber is located 26 m (85 ft) below ground, is nearly square in shape, with a base of 3.63 m × 2.65 m (11.9 ft × 8.7 ft), and a ceiling height of 3 m (9.8 ft). The burial chamber contained no traces of a sarcophagus, which together with the absence of artefacts in the gallery, hints to the premature death of the king.

== Funerary complex and necropolis ==
=== Funerary complex ===
The funerary complex of the layer pyramid shows no trace of an enclosure wall, which is present in both earlier and later pyramid complexes. This could be because the stones constituting the wall were robbed over time, or simply because the wall was never started, being usually the last element of the pyramid complex to be built. At the eastern side of the pyramid, the remnants of brick walls could indicate the presence of a mortuary temple, but the archaeological traces are so tenuous that any closer examination and more precise reconstruction is impossible today. The same goes for the ruins of a building several hundred metres away from the pyramid, and which might have been the valley temple. If this was indeed a valley temple, its east-west orientation would be unique in all pyramid complexes.

=== Necropolis ===
The layer pyramid is surrounded by a total of five cemeteries dating to the 1st Dynasty, 2nd Dynasty, late 3rd Dynasty, 18th Dynasty and Roman Period. Of these cemeteries, only the one dating to the late 3rd Dynasty contains large tombs, of which are four mud brick mastabas. Reisner and Fisher observe that this is to be expected of the necropolis surrounding the pyramid of a pharaoh, the large tombs being those of the royal family and court officials. In particular, around 200 metres (660 ft) north of the layer pyramid is a huge mastaba, today known as Mastaba Z500, which yielded eight marble bowls inscribed with the serekh of king Khaba. Reisner and Fisher therefore conclude that "if the mastabas belong to people connected with the king who built the pyramid, it is probable that the king’s name was Khaba". This opinion is shared by most egyptologists who attribute the layer pyramid to Khaba.

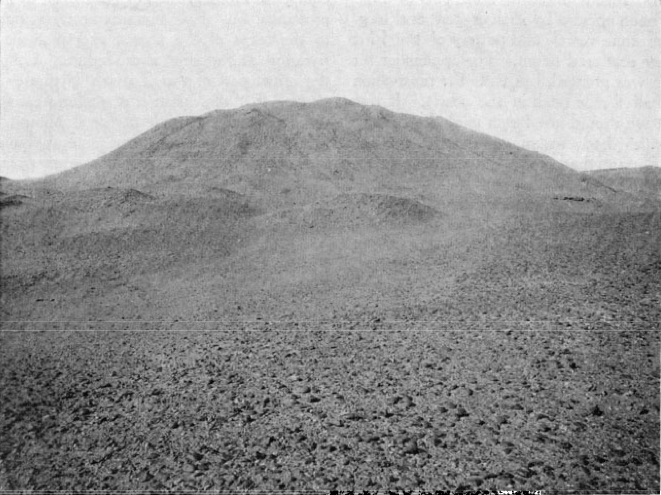
The layer pyramid as seen from the east, just prior to Reisner and Fisher excavations in 1910-1911

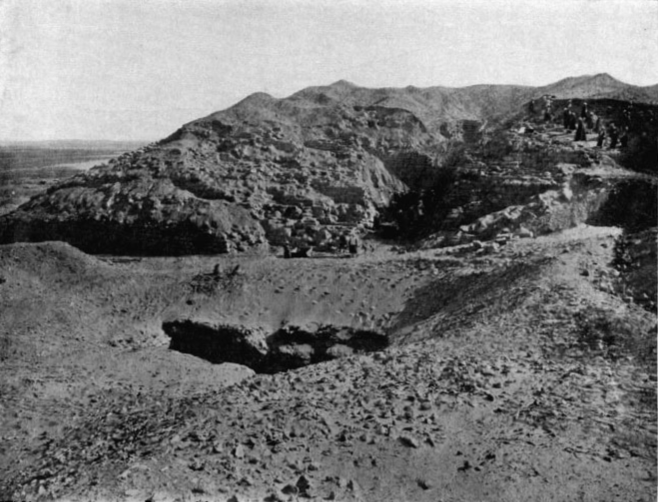
North face of the layer pyramid, 1910

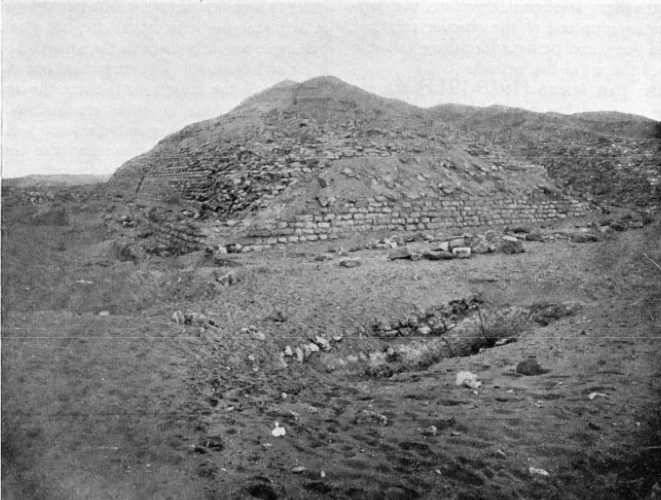
Mud-brick masonry of the layer pyramid, 1910

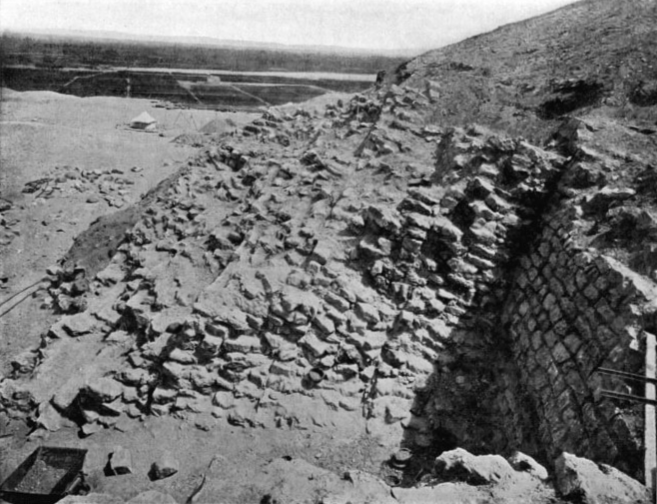
Nearly vertical masonry of mud-brick of the layer pyramid, looking east, 1910

== Date and attribution ==
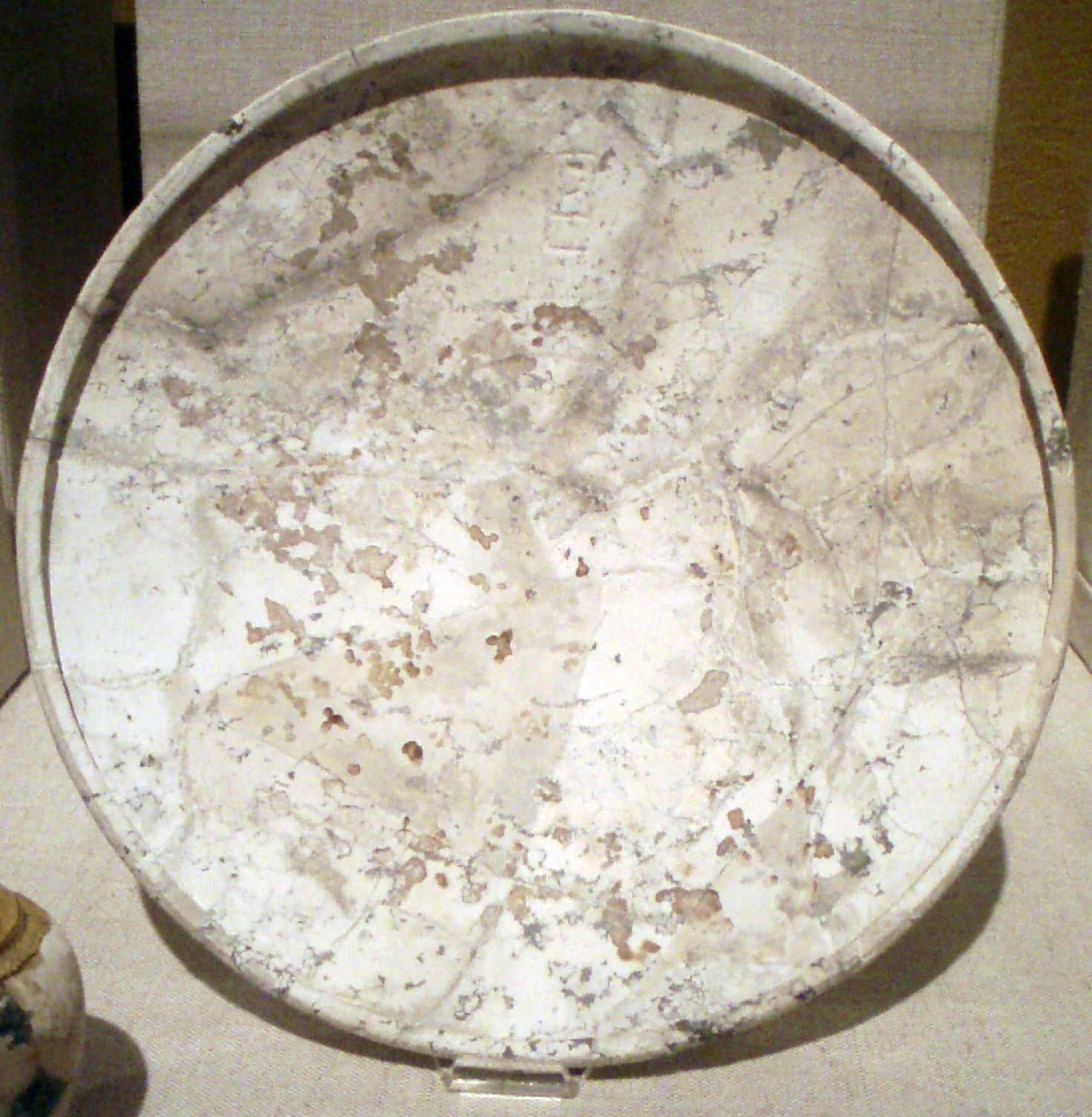
Dolomite bowl bearing the serekh of Khaba from Mastaba Z500

The architecture of the layer pyramid allows it to be securely dated to the time span between the reigns of king Sekhemkhet and that of king Snofru, the founder of the 4th Dynasty. Rainer Stadelmann, Miroslav Verner and Jean-Philippe Lauer compare the architecture of the layer pyramid with that of the step pyramids of Djoser and Sekhemkhet, expecting the layer pyramid to have originally consisted of five steps, just as its near-contemporary predecessors. The layer pyramid exhibits at one site both complex developments concerning its substructures and simplifications concerning the building methods employed for the superstructure. According to these egyptologists, the layer pyramid is a clearly advanced version of the buried pyramid of Sekhemkhet.

The remaining problem about the layer pyramid is the question of who had it built. Most scholars today believe that it was likely king Khaba of the late 3rd Dynasty. This conclusion is based on stone bowls and vases bearing the serekh of Khaba discovered in Mastaba Z500, located just north of the pyramid. Rainer Stadelmann goes further and identifies Khaba with king Huni, the last ruler of the 3rd Dynasty. His hypothesis is based on his reading of the Turin canon, a kinglist compiled in the early Ramesside period c. 1300 BC, some 1,400 years after Huni's lifetime. The Turin canon credits Huni with a relatively long reign of 24 years. According to Stadelmann, this time would be sufficient to cover the time span needed to complete the building of the layer pyramid. He also argues that royal monuments of the first three Egyptian dynasties only present a king's horus name in a serekh and only later do they record the throne or birth name. Thus, the serekh of Khaba could correspond to the throne name Huni. In this case, the layer pyramid would be Huni's tomb. This conclusion is contested by most Egyptologists who think that Huni instead built the Meidum Pyramid, point to the apparent unfinished state of the layer pyramid and identify Khaba with king Hudjefa II mentioned on the Turin canon.

== See also ==
- List of Egyptian pyramids
- Lepsius list of pyramids
- Egyptian pyramid construction techniques
- Egyptian pyramids
