= Khenmetptah =

Khenmetptah was an ancient Egyptian king's daughter who lived most likely in the Second Dynasty. She is only known from her stela once placed in her tomb and found at Helwan. On the stela, Khenmetptah is shown sitting on a chair in front of an offering table. Next to the offering table are shown many offerings. Above this scene is a short text: the king's daughter Khenmetptah. Her royal father is not known. On stylistical grounds, the stela is datable to the Second Dynasty.
