= Hudjefa I =

Egyptian pharaoh

Hudjefa
- Huzefa; Real name unknown
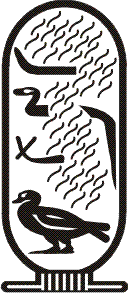
- Relief of the cartouche of Hudjefa on the Saqqara table (incomplete)

Pharaoh
- Reign: 11 years, 8 months, and 4 days, 28th century BC
- Predecessor: Neferkasokar
- Successor: Khasekhemwy
Royal titulary
Prenomen
Hudjefa
Ḥw-ḏf3
Turin Canon
< V28 I10 I9 G1 G41 G37 > G7
Hudjefa
Ḥw-ḏf3
Saqqara King List
< F18 I10 I9 G42 >

Hudjefa (Ancient Egyptian for "erased" or "missing") is the pseudonym for a 2nd Dynasty pharaoh as reported on the Turin canon, a list of kings written during the reign of Ramses II. Hudjefa is now understood to mean that the name of the king was already missing from the document from which the Turin canon was copied. The length of the reign associated to Hudjefa on the canon is 11 years. Because of the position of Hudjefa on the Turin list, he is sometimes identified with a king Sesochris reported in the Aegyptiaca, a history of Egypt written by the Egyptian priest Manetho in the 3rd century BC. Manetho credits this pharaoh with 48 years of reign. Egyptologists have attempted to relate Hudjefa with archaeologically attested kings of the period, in particular Seth-Peribsen.

== Name sources ==
The name "Hudjefa" appears only in the Royal Table of Sakkara and in the Royal Canon of Turin. Both king lists describe Hudjefa I as the immediate successor of king Neferkasokar and as the predecessor of king Khasekhemwy (here named Bebty).

== Identity ==
Egyptologists and historians have had great difficulty linking Hudjefa I to any archaeologically identified ruler. The problem is that "Hudjefa" is not a personal name in the conventional sense. Hudjefa means "erased" and might reveal that the original king's name, originally listed in a document or inscribed on some object, was unreadable when the scribe tried to compile the king list. It is thought that a scribe simply noted "erased", but then erroneously put the word into a cartouche, thus making it look like a personal name. Later scribes and students of Egyptian history misinterpreted the arrangement and adopted it into their documents as a king's name.

The ancient Greek historian Manetho probably called Hudjefa I "Sésôchris" and reported that this king's body had a measurement of "five cubits in its height and three hands in its breadth". Egyptologists doubt the basis of this observation as no burial site for Hudjefa I has ever been found.

Egyptologists such as N. Dautzenberg and Wolfgang Helck once considered that Hudjefa I might be identical with king Seth-Peribsen. To support their theory, they pointed out that an 11-year reign – as noted in the Royal Canon of Turin – would be inconsistent with a king whose name has been lost. Rather, in their opinion, it would make sense if the ruler's name was not allowed to be mentioned in later times. This was already considered to be the case of king Peribsen, whose birth name was banished from Ramesside king lists.

== Reign ==
Egyptologists such as Wolfgang Helck, Nicolas Grimal, Hermann Alexander Schlögl and Francesco Tiradritti believe that king Nynetjer, the third ruler of 2nd dynasty and a predecessor of Peribsen, left a realm that was suffering from an overly complex state administration and that Nynetjer decided to split Egypt to leave it to his two sons (or, at least, two chosen successors) who would rule two separate kingdoms, in the hope that the two rulers could better administer the states. In contrast, Egyptologists such as Barbara Bell believe that an economic catastrophe such as a famine or a long lasting drought affected Egypt. Therefore, to better address the problem of feeding the Egyptian population, Ninetjer split the realm into two and his successors founded two independent realms, until the famine came to an end. Bell points to the inscriptions of the Palermo stone, where, in her opinion, the records of the annual Nile floods show constantly low levels during this period. Bell's theory is refuted today by Egyptologists such as Stephan Seidlmayer, who corrected Bell's calculations. Seidlmayer has shown that the annual Nile floods were at usual levels at Nynetjer's time up to the period of the Old Kingdom. Bell had overlooked that the heights of the Nile floods in the Palermo stone inscription only takes into account the measurements of the nilometers around Memphis, but not elsewhere along the river. Any long-lasting drought can therefore be excluded.

It is accepted amongst a number of Egyptologists that Hudjefa I had to share his throne with another ruler although it is unclear as to who that ruler was. Later king lists such as the Sakkara list and the Turin Canon list the kings Neferkara I and Neferkasokar as his predecessors and king Khasekhemwy as immediate successors. The Abydos list skips the rulers Neferkara I, Neferkasokar and Hudjefa I completely and name a king Djadjay (identical with king Khasekhemwy). If Egypt was already divided when Hudjefa I gained the throne, kings like Sekhemib and Peribsen would have ruled Upper Egypt, whilst Hudjefa I and his predecessors would have ruled Lower Egypt. The division of Egypt was brought to an end by king Khasekhemwy.

| Preceded by Neferkasokar | Pharaoh of Egypt | Succeeded by Khasekhemwy |
