= Nisuheqet =

- King's son
Egyptian name
ns n sw s H q t I7 ni-sw-Hqt
He who belongs to Heqet

Nisuheqet was an ancient Egyptian king's son of the Second Dynasty. Nisuheqet is only known from his stela found in tomb 964.H.8 at Helwan. The only title he bears on this monument is king's son. The stela is made of limestone and shows the prince on the left, sitting on a chair with an offering table and offerings in front of him. The stela was discovered by Zaki Saad, during excavations at Helwan that were conducted between 1952 and 1954. The royal father of this king's son remains unknown.
