= Neferkasokar =

Seventh pharaoh of the second Egyptian dynasty

- Neferkaseker, Sesochris
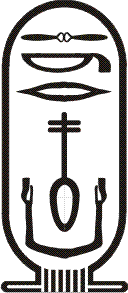
- Relief of the cartouche of Neferkasokar on the Saqqara table

Pharaoh
- Reign: 8 years, 3 months
- Predecessor: Neferkara I
- Successor: Hudjefa I
Royal titulary
Prenomen
Cylinder seal
Nisut-bitj-Neferkasokar
nsw.t-btj-Nfr-k3-skr
Perfect is the Ka of Sokar
M23 X1 L2 X1 < O34 k r F35 D28 >
Saqqara King List
Neferkasokar
Nfr-k3-skr
Perfect is the Ka of Sokar
< O34 k r F35 D28 >
Turin Canon
Neferkasokar
Nfr-k3-skr
Perfect is the Ka of Sokar
< F35 D28 Z1 O34 k r Z5 G7 > G7
Turin Canon (alternative reading)
Aakasokar
3ʼ-k3-skr
< O29V D28 Z1 O34 k r Z5 G7 > G7
- Dynasty: 2nd Dynasty; around 2740 B.C.

Neferkasokar (Ancient Egyptian Nefer-Ka-Seker; which means “beautiful soul of Sokar” or “the soul of Sokar is perfect”) is the cartouche name of a king (pharaoh) who is said to have ruled during the 2nd Dynasty of Ancient Egypt. Very little is known about him, since no contemporary records about him have been found. Rather his name has been found in later sources.

== Name sources ==
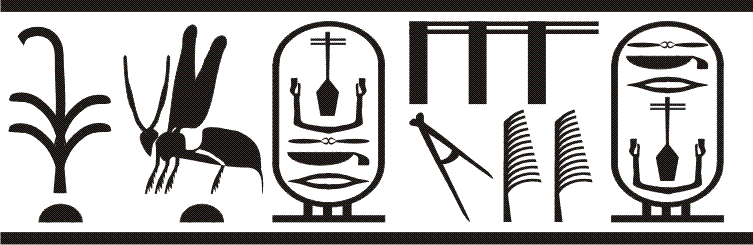
Seal impression showing the cartouche name of king Neferkasokar.

Neferkasokar appears in the Saqqara king list from the tomb of the 19th dynasty high priest Tjuneroy, where he is recorded as succeeding king Neferkare I and precedes king Hudjefa I in the ninth cartouche.

He also appears in the Royal Canon of Turin as the successor of a king Neferkara I and as the predecessor of king Hudjefa I. His cartouche can be found in column III, line 1. The Turin papyrus records him having a reign of 8 years and 3 months. However, some Egyptologists such as Alan H. Gardiner think it should instead read as Aakasokar.

Furthermore, Neferkasokar's name appears on a steatite cylinder seal of unknown provenance. The inscription bears the king's name twice within royal cartouches. The first cartouche shows the name of the god Sokar on top, whilst the second cartouche places the syllable Neferka above the god's name. A guiding inscription says Meri-netjeru, which means "beloved one of the gods". This titulary was common from the Middle Kingdom onwards, thus the cylinder seal is not likely to originate from the 2nd Dynasty. Most Egyptologists date the object to the 13th Dynasty. Some Egyptologists also question the authenticity of the seal.

Neferkasokar also plays an important role in a papyrus originating from the Middle Kingdom. The text was translated around 237 BC into the demotic language and is preserved in papyrus p. Wien D6319. The papyrus gives instructions on how to build temples and how the temple priests should perform their tasks.

The papyrus also includes a story that royal scribes under the supervision of 4th dynasty prince Djedefhor had discovered an old document in a forgotten chamber, which was sealed by king Neferkasokar. The discovered papyrus contained a report of a famine that affected Egypt for seven years and king Neferkasokar was instructed by a celestial oracle through a dream to restore all Egyptian temples. When the king finished his mission successfully, the Nile started flowing normally again. As a result, Neferkasokar issues a decree which is rediscovered by prince Djedefhor.

Egyptologist and linguist Joachim Friedrich Quack later gave this treatise the name "Book of the Temple".

== Reign ==
Very little is known about Neferkasokar's reign. Egyptologists such as Iorwerth Eiddon Stephen Edwards and Walter Bryan Emery think that Neferkasokar ruled only in Lower Egypt, since his name appeared in the Sakkara king list, but is missing from the Abydos king list while the Sakkara king lists reflect Memphite traditions. Neferkasokar is also thought to have ruled in Lower Egypt around the same time that kings such as Peribsen and Sekhemib-Perenmaat ruled in Upper Egypt. This assumption would be consistent with the view of a number of Egyptologists that at that time Egypt was divided into two parts. The theory of a divided realm since the end of king Nynetjer's reign is based on a study of the name of king Peribsen, whose name is connected to the Ombite deity Seth to show that he came from Ombos and ruled an area that included Ombos. Peribsen himself is contemporaneously documented in materials found in the Thinite region, but was excluded from documentation associated with the Memphites. His case therefore corresponds to Neferkasokar's case, but for Lower Egypt. Neferkasokar's predecessors may have been king Senedj and king Neferkara I; his successor may have been king Hudjefa I.

Preceded by Neferkara I	Pharaoh of Egypt	Succeeded by Hudjefa I
