= Neferkare I =

Ancient Egyptian ruler

- Neferkara I, Neferka, Aaka, Nephercheres
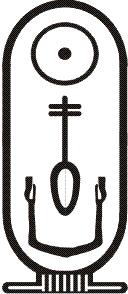
- Relief of the cartouche of Neferkare on the Saqqara table

Pharaoh
- Predecessor: Senedj
- Successor: Neferkasokar
Royal titulary
Prenomen
Abydos King List
Neferkare
Nfr-k3-r3
Perfect is the Ka of Ra
< N5 F35 D28 >
Saqqara King List
Neferkare
Nfr-k3-r3
Perfect is the Ka of Ra
< N5 F35 D28 >
Turin Canon
Neferka
Nfr-k3
My Ka is perfect/He has perfected my Ka
< F35 D28 Z1 > G7
Turin Canon (alternative reading)
Aaka
3ʼ-k3
< O29V D28 Z1 > G7
- Dynasty: 2nd Dynasty

Neferkare I also spelled Neferkara I (Ancient Egyptian Nefer-Ka-Ra; which means "beautiful soul of Ra" or "the soul of Ra is perfect", also spelled as Neferka and, alternatively, Aaka) is the cartouche name of a king (pharaoh) who is said to have ruled during the 2nd Dynasty of Ancient Egypt. The exact length of his reign is unknown since the Turin canon lacks the years of rulership and the ancient Egyptian priest Manetho suggests that Neferkare's reign lasted 25 years. Egyptologists evaluate his statement as a misinterpretation or exaggeration.

== Name sources ==
Although the name "Neferkare" appears in the Abydos King list several times, this very Pharaoh according to Jürgen von Beckerath and several others is not depicted here. It is assumed that the 19th entry in this list is to be assigned to a much later Pharaoh Huni whose nomen presumably was Neferka. The name "Neferkare" however appears in the Saqqara King list. The Turin Royal Canon lists a king's name which is disputed for its uncertain reading. Egyptologists such as Alan H. Gardiner read "Aaka", whilst other Egyptologists, such as Beckenrath, read "Neferka". Both kinglists describe Neferkare I as the immediate successor of King Senedj and as the predecessor of King Neferkasokar.

== Identity ==
There is no contemporary name source for this king and no Horus name could be connected to Neferkare I up to this day. In contrast, Egyptologists such as Kim Ryholt believe that Neferkare/Neferka was identical to a sparsely attested king named Sneferka, which is also thought to be a name used by King Qa'a (the last ruler of the 1st dynasty) for a short time only. Ryholt thinks that Ramesside scribes misleadingly added the symbol of the sun to the name "(S)neferka", ignoring the fact that the sun itself was no object of divine adoration yet during the 2nd dynasty. For a comparison he points to cartouche names such as Neferkare II from the kinglist of Abydos and Nebkare I from the Sakkara table.

Aidan Dodson equated Neferkare with Seth-Peribsen.

The ancient historian Manetho called Neferkare I "Népherchêres" and reported that during this king's rulership "the Nile was flowing with honey for eleven days". Egyptologists think that this collocation was meant to show that the realm was flourishing under King Nephercheres.

== The division of Egypt ==
Egyptologists such as Wolfgang Helck, Nicolas Grimal, Hermann Alexander Schlögl and Francesco Tiradritti believe that king Nynetjer, the third ruler of second dynasty, left a realm that was suffering from an overly complex state administration and that Ninetjer decided to split Egypt to leave it to his two sons (or, at least, rightful throne successors) who would rule two separate kingdoms, in the hope that the two rulers could better administer the states. In contrast, Egyptologists such as Barbara Bell believe that an economic catastrophe like a famine or a long lasting drought affected Egypt. Therefore, to address the problem of feeding the Egyptian population, Ninetjer split the realm and his successors founded two independent realms, until the famine came to an end. Bell points to the inscriptions of the Palermo stone, where, in her opinion, the records of the annual Nile floods show constantly low levels during this period. Bell's theory is refuted today by Egyptologists such as Stephan Seidlmayer, who corrected Bell's calculations. Seidlmayer has shown that the annual Nile floods were at usual levels at Ninetjer's time up to the period of the Old Kingdom. Bell had overlooked, that the heights of the Nile floods in the Palermo stone inscription only takes the measurements of the nilometers around Memphis into account, but not elsewhere in Egypt. Any long-lasting drought can therefore be excluded.

It is a commonly accepted theory, that Neferkare I had to share his throne with another ruler. It is just unclear yet, with whom. Later kinglists such as the Sakkara list and the Turin canon list the kings Neferkasokar and Hudjefa I as immediate successors. The Abydos list skips all these three rulers and name a king Djadjay (identical with king Khasekhemwy). If Egypt was already divided when Neferkare I gained the throne, kings like Sekhemib and Peribsen would have ruled Upper Egypt, whilst Neferkare I and his successors would have ruled Lower Egypt. The division of Egypt was brought to an end by king Khasekhemwy.

Preceded by Senedj	Pharaoh of Egypt	Succeeded by Neferkasokar
