= Helwan (cemetery) =

Helwan حلوان (in Arabic)
- archaeological site
- Location in Egypt
- Coordinates: 29°51′N 31°20′E
- Country: Egypt
- Governorate: Cairo
- Time zone: UTC+2 (EST)

Helwan is a large ancient Egyptian cemetery with more than 10,000 burials excavated at the modern city of Helwan, south of modern Cairo. The cemetery was in use from the Naqada Period around 3200 BC to the Fourth Dynasty and again at the beginning of the Middle Kingdom and then up to the Roman Period and beyond. The burial ground was discovered and excavated by Zaki Saad in 1942 to 1954. Further excavations started in 1997 by an Australian expedition. The excavations of Zaki Saad were never fully published, only several preliminary reports appeared. Helwan was most likely the cemetery of Memphis in the first Dynasties. The tombs range from small pits to bigger elaborated mastabas. Regarding the underground parts of these tombs, two types are attested. There are on one side pits with the burial at the bottom and there are on the other side underground chambers, reached via a pit or via a staircase. The majority of burials are for one deceased.

There are some examples of multiple burials. The deceased were mostly placed in reed mats or coffins of different materials. Most of the bodies were found in a contracted position. Most tombs were built of mud bricks. Roofs are often made of timber. Some walls in the underground chambers were covered with plaster. In several tombs stones were found, used for roofing the tomb chamber, for blocking the entrance and in rare cases for paving walls. Some of the more elaborate tombs had several underground chambers. These chambers were often reached via a staircase. The people buried here belonged to all levels of society, albeit the highest officials were buried at Saqqara. Over 40 stelae were found belonging to the upper levels of society. They are an important source for early writing in Egypt. A certain Meriiti bears many titles on his stela and dates most likely to the First Dynasty. A few stelae also belong to members of the royal family, such as the king's daughter Satkhnum, the king's daughter Khenmetptah and the king's son Nisuheqet. The stelae date from about the middle of the First Dynasty to the early Fourth Dynasty.
