= Meriiti =

Ancient Egyptian official

Meriiti (Meri-iti, beloved of the father) was an ancient Egyptian official living at the end of the First Dynasty around 2900 BC. He is only known from his stela found in tomb 810.H.11 at Helwan. The stela was found in the burial chamber next to the coffin. It shows on the left Meriiti sitting on a chair with offerings in front of him. On the right side of the stela is a list of Meriiti's titles.

On this stela Meriiti bears seven titles making him one of the few officials of the period with a longer string of titles.

Meriiti's titles:

- priest of Khnum, companion of the house
- director of the dining hall of the chamber of life
- master/carpenter of Nekhen
- director of the dining hall and the great magazine (as in storehouse)
- commander of the qedhetep-administration
- helping hand
- manager of the office of the west, carrier of Anubis
