= Sedjes =

Ancient Egyptian pharaoh

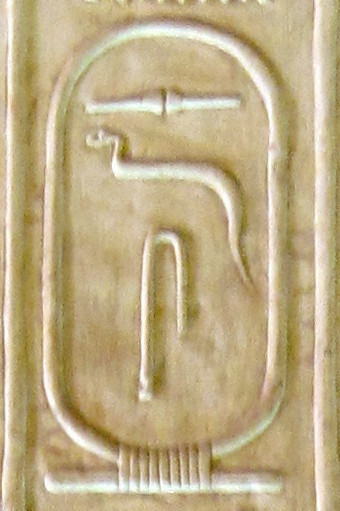
- Cartouche of the name Sedjes from the Abydos King List.

Pharaoh
- Reign: Unknown
Royal titulary
Prenomen
Abydos King List
Sedjes
sds
"omitted" or "missing"
M23 t L2 t < O34 I10 S29 >
- Dynasty: 3rd Dynasty

Sedjes is an ancient Egyptian cartouche "name" for a king (pharaoh), who is said to have ruled during the 3rd Dynasty (Old Kingdom period). The lexeme appears only once in the Abydos King List as cartouche No. 18, presented as if it were the name of the direct follower of king Sekhemkhet (here named Teti) and the direct predecessor of king Neferkara I.

In the 19th century it was thought by Egyptologists and historians to be the name of a king, because the scribes had placed the word sedjes inside a royal cartouche. But as knowledge about Ancient Egyptian phrasing and grammars advanced, scholars realized its true meaning: sedjes means "omitted" or "missing" with the scribes using the word as a pseudonym, replacing a now illegible name of a king. They encircled it with a royal cartouche to mark it as a king's name, but following generations of scribes erroneously took it as the actual birth name of the to-be listed king. A similar case can be observed with the ominous cartouche name Hudjefa, also used as a pseudonym for missing royal names. Today, it is passionately disputed which king of the 3rd Dynasty was meant to be denoted in cartouche No. 18.
