= Egg (hieroglyph) =

Egyptian hieroglyph

H8
Egg
in hieroglyphs

The ancient Egyptian Egg hieroglyph, Gardiner sign listed no. H8, is a portrayal of an oval-shaped egg, tilted at an angle, within the Gardiner signs for parts of birds.

It is an Egyptian language hieroglyph determinative used for the Egyptian word swht, "egg". It is also used for the names of goddesses. Goddess Isis uses the egg in her hieroglyphic block. Q1 X1 H8 There are variations of her name block. Cleopatra III uses the Egg hieroglyph as part of her name within her cartouche .

== See also ==
- Gardiner's Sign List#H. Parts of Birds
- List of Egyptian hieroglyphs
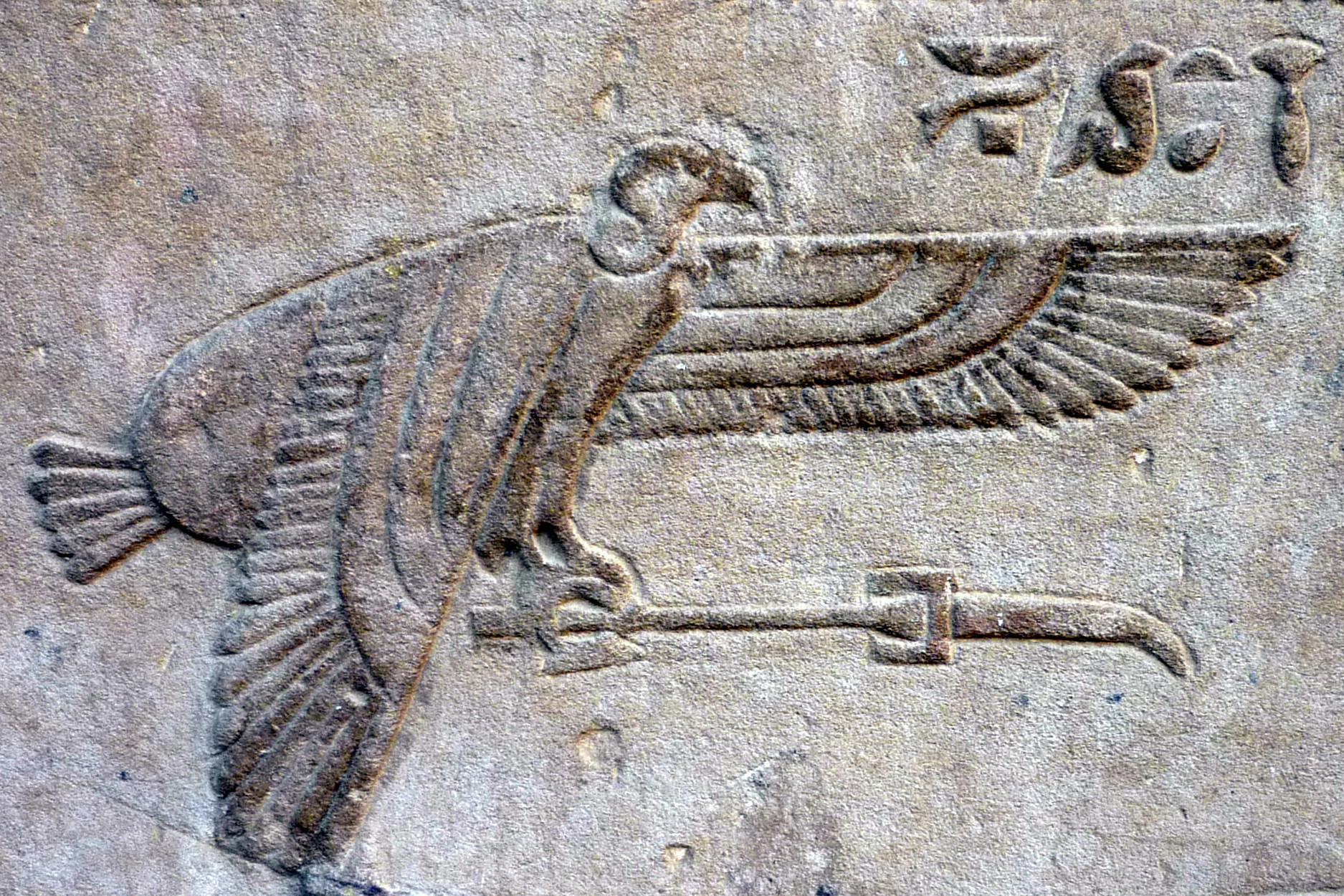
Wall relief

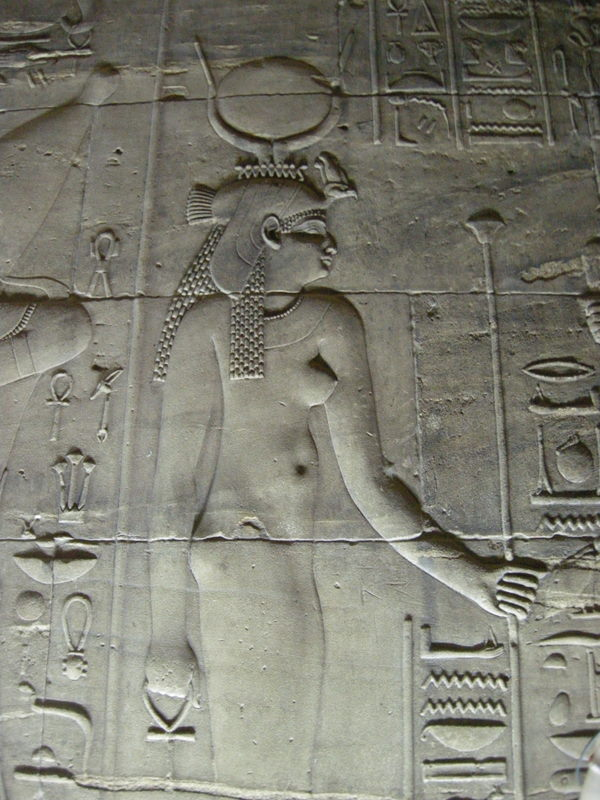
Relief

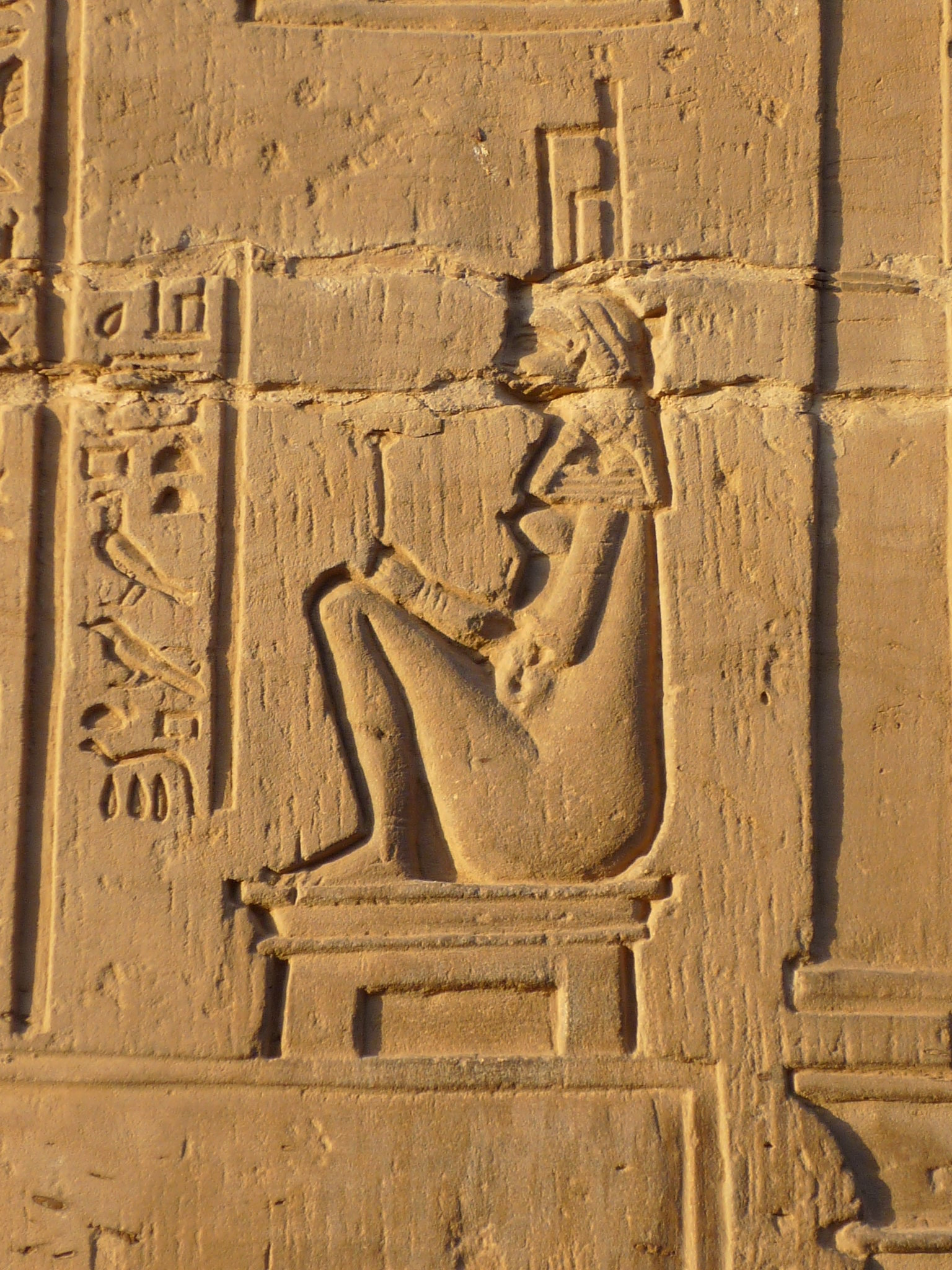
Goddess Isis

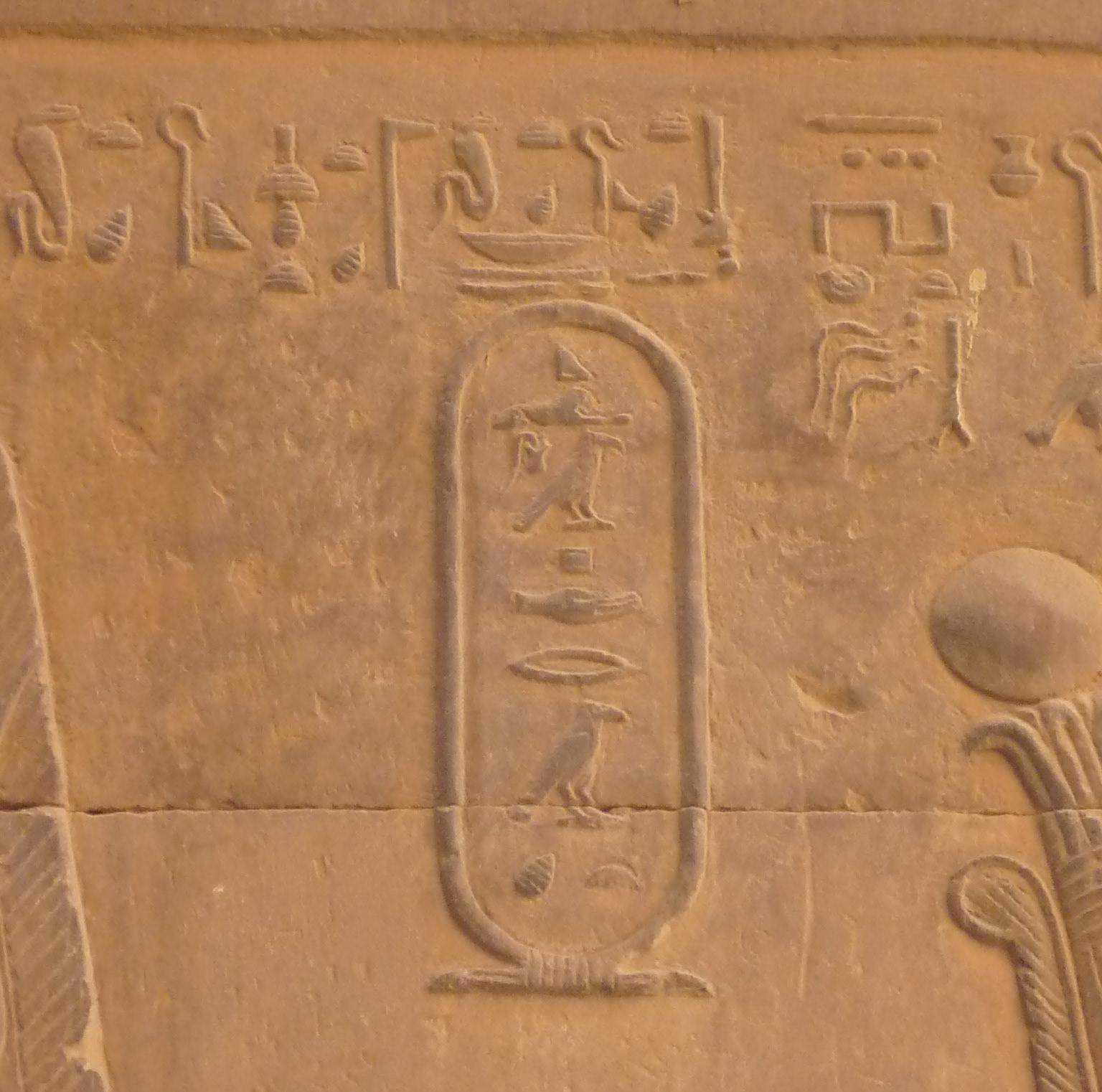
Cleopatra III cartouche, and multiple uses of the Egg hieroglyph

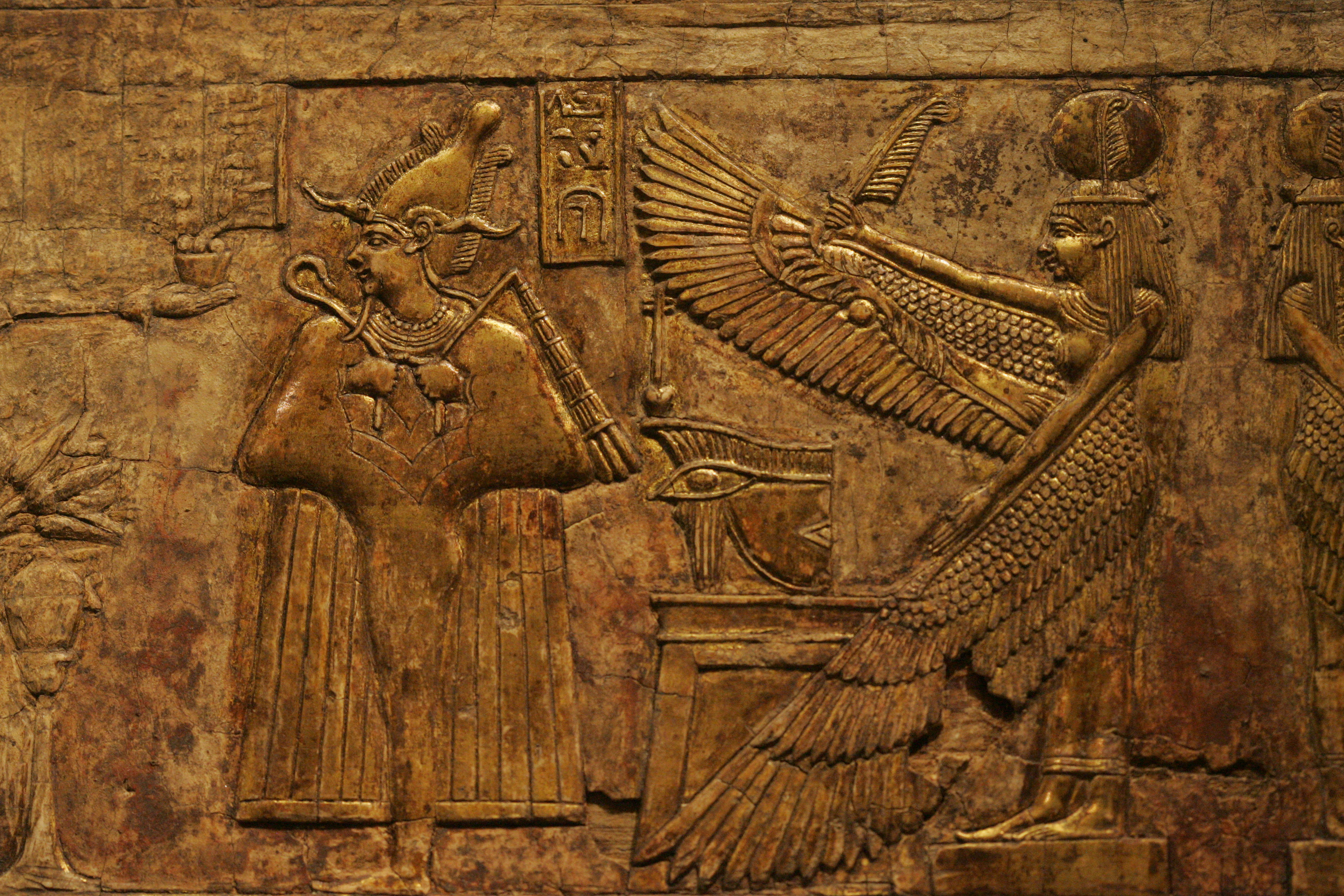
