= Tjuneroy =

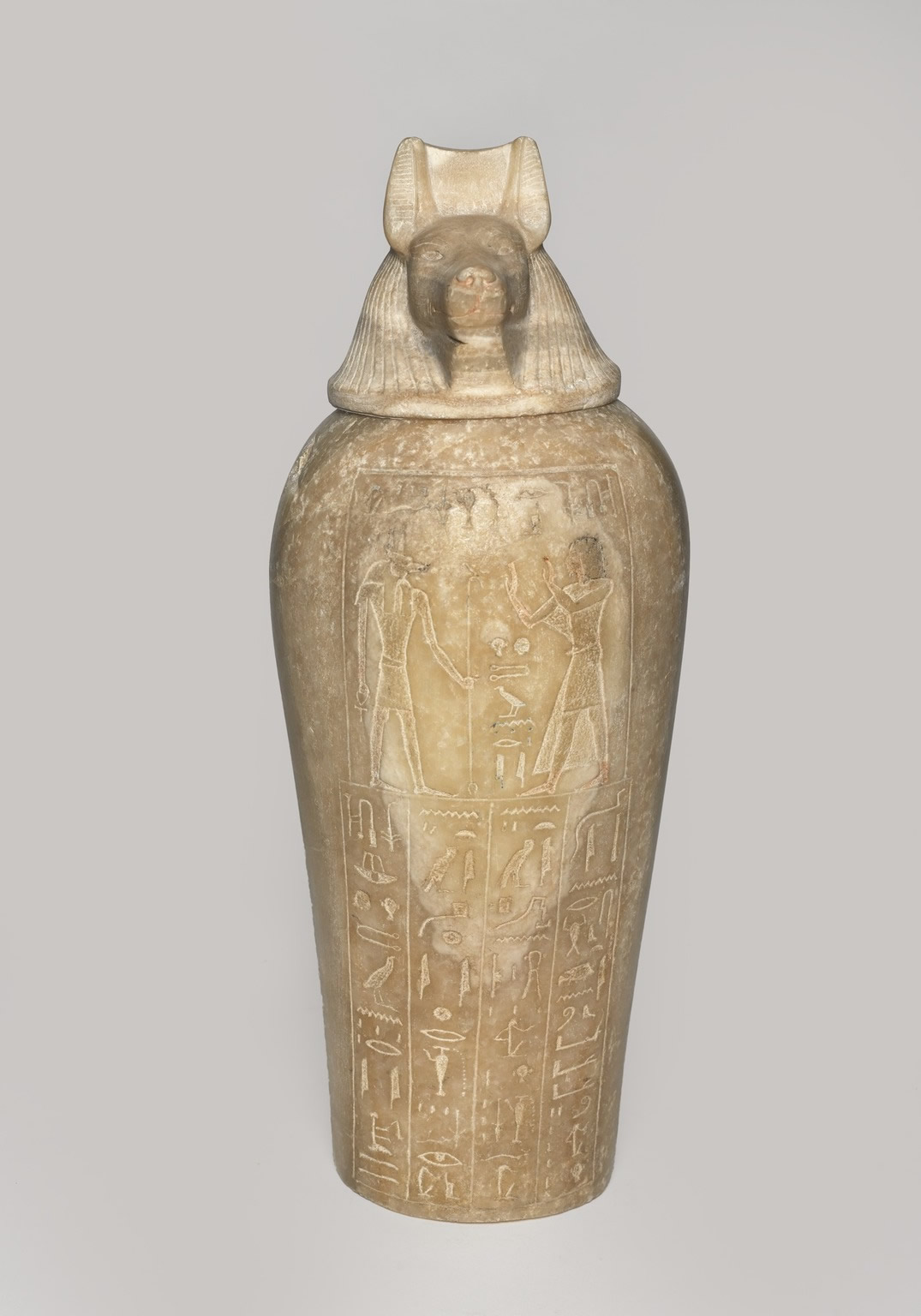
Canopic jar of Tjuneroy

Tjuneroy (also Tjenry) was an Ancient Egyptian official under king Ramses II in the 19th Dynasty. His tomb chapel contained the famous Saqqara Tablet.

At Saqqara, Tjuneroy is mainly known from objects found in his tomb. He came from an influential family. His father Paser (I) was royal scribe and was working for the Amun temple. His brother Paser (II) held the title royal scribe and overseer of royal building works. The tomb chapel of Tjuneroy was once decorated with reliefs that are now in the Egyptian Museum in Cairo. One wall in the tomb chapel was decorated with a king list that is known as the Saqqara Tablet. Tjuneroy is also known from fragments of a door frame found at Pi-Ramesses indicating that he lived there. His titles include chief lecture priest and overseer of all monuments of the king.
