= Hudjefa =

Ancient Egyptian name placeholder

V28 I10 I9 G1 G41 G37

Ḥw-ḏf3
in hieroglyphs

Hudjefa (also read as Huzefa) is an ancient Egyptian word meaning "missing" or "erased". It was used by the royal scribes of the Ramesside era during the Nineteenth Dynasty of Egypt, when the scribes compiled king lists such as the Abydos King List, the royal table of Sakkara and the Royal Canon of Turin when the name of a deceased pharaoh was unreadable, damaged, or completely erased.

In the 19th century it was thought by Egyptologists and historians to be the name of a king, because the scribes had placed the word hudjefa inside a royal cartouche. But as knowledge about Ancient Egyptian phrasing and grammar advanced, scholars realized its true meaning. The scribes used the word hudjefa as a pseudonym replacing an illegible name of a king. They encircled it with a royal cartouche to mark it as a king's name, but following generations of scribes erroneously took it as the actual birth name of the to-be listed king. The Abydos King List presents the cartouche name Sedjes as the follower of king Sekhemkhet, which is interesting, since sedjes simply means "omitted" or "missing". Thus, the cartouche No.18 actually presents no real name, but an "erased" note, just like the hudjefa notes. Known examples for missing kings are Hudjefa I, Sedjes and Hudjefa II.

== See also ==
- Nomen nescio
