= Saqqara Tablet =

Ancient stone engraving surviving from the Ramesside Period of Egypt

The Saqqara Tablet, also known as the Saqqara King List or the Saqqara Table,, is an ancient stone engraving surviving from the Ramesside Period of Egypt which features a list of pharaohs. It was found in 1861 in Saqqara, in the tomb of Tjuneroy (or Tjenry), an official ("chief lector priest" and "Overseer of Works on All Royal Monuments") of the pharaoh Ramesses II. First moved to the Egyptian Museum, today it is on display at the Grand Egyptian Museum.

The inscription lists fifty-eight kings, from Anedjib (First Dynasty) to Ramesses II (Nineteenth Dynasty), in reverse chronological order. The names (each surrounded by a border known as a cartouche), of which only forty-seven survive, are badly damaged. As with other Egyptian king lists, the Saqqara Tablet omits certain kings and entire dynasties. The list counts backward from Ramesses II to the mid-point of the First Dynasty, except for the Eleventh and Twelfth Dynasties, which are reversed. A well known photograph of the king list was published in 1865. Detailed and high resolution images are able to be viewed online and inside the book Inside the Egyptian Museum with Zahi Hawass Each cartouche ends with the phrase ma'a, meaning "the justified", which was typical for honouring deceased kings.

Like with other Ramesside lists, the Saqqara Tablet omits the names of "rulers from the Second Intermediate Period, the Hyksos, and those rulers... who had been close to the heretic Akhenaten". Despite being nearly a slimmed down copy of the Abydos King List, the Saqqara Tablet has some notable changes. For example, Neferirkare Kakai is listed under his prenomen Neferirkare like with every other pharaoh in the list, despite being listed under his nomen Kakai in the Abydos King List. Also, Neferkare I, Neferkasokar, Hudjefa, Huni and Sobekneferu are listed in the Saqqara Tablet, despite being absent in the Abydos King List. Likewise, Nyuserre Ini and Userkare are absent for some unknown reason, despite being present in the Abydos King List. In addition, the early rulers of the First Dynasty (Menes/Narmer, Hor-Aha, Djer, Djet, Den, and Semerkhet) are all excluded from the Saqqara Tablet for some unknown reason, despite being present in the Abydos King List. The Saqqara Tablet additionally omits all kings who reigned between Pepi II and Mentuhotep II.

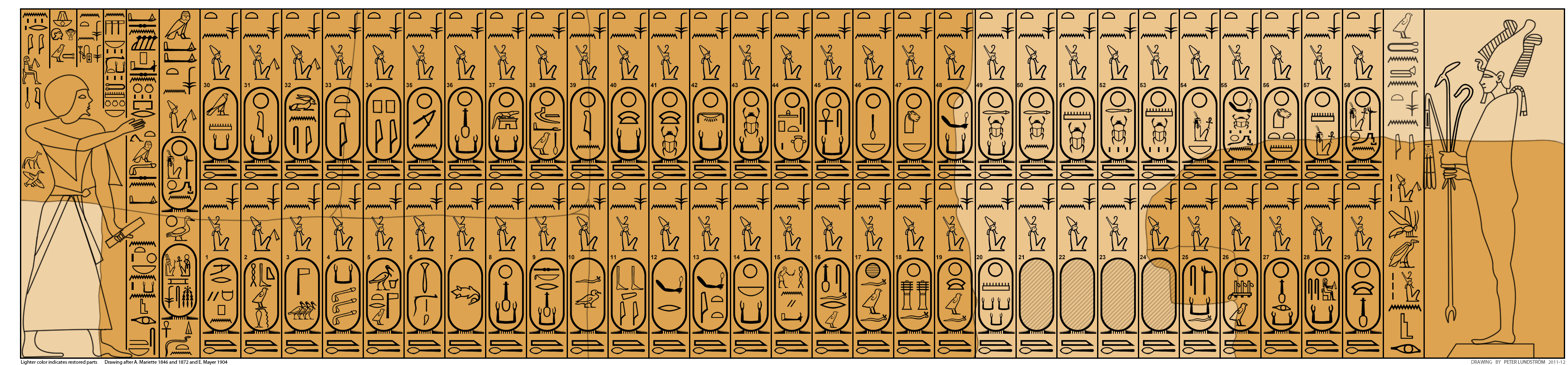
Drawing of the Saqqara King List based on photographs and drawings from 1864-65.

== Kings in the list ==
The names are listed in reverse chronological order from the upper right to the bottom left, as they were meant to be read. Pharaohs that are known have the damaged part of the inscribed name in parentheses.

=== Upper row ===
==== Nineteenth Dynasty ====
#	Pharaoh	Name written in the list	Hieroglyphs
1.	Ramesses II	(Usermaatre) setepen(re)	sw t n A43 < ra wsr mAat stp ra n > mAa T1
2.	Seti I	(Men)maat(re)	sw t n A45 < ra mn mAat > mAa T1
3.	Ramesses I	Men(pehtire)	sw t n A43 < ra F9 t t mn > mAa T1

==== Eighteenth Dynasty ====
#	Pharaoh	Name written in the list	Hieroglyphs
4.	Horemheb	(Djeserkheperure) setepen(re)	sw t n A45 < ra Dsr xpr Z2 stp ra n > mAa T1
5.	Names lost		
6.	Names lost		
7.	Names lost		
8.	Names lost		
9.	Names lost		
10.	Names lost		
11.	Amenhotep I	Djeserkare	sw t n A43 < ra Dsr kA > mAa T1
12.	Ahmose I	Nebpehtire	sw t n A45 < ra F9 nb > mAa T1

==== Eleventh Dynasty ====
#	Pharaoh	Name written in the list	Hieroglyphs
13.	Mentuhotep II	Nebhepetre	sw t n A43 < ra xrw nb > mAa T1
14.	Mentuhotep III	Seankhkare	sw t n A45 < ra s anx kA > mAa T1

==== Twelfth Dynasty ====
#	Pharaoh	Name written in the list	Hieroglyphs
15.	Amenemhat I	Sehetepibre	sw t n A43 < ra s Htp t p ib Z1 > mAa T1
16.	Senusret I	Kheperkare	sw t n A45 < ra xpr kA > mAa T1
17.	Amenemhat II	Nubkaure	sw t n A43 < ra nbw kA > mAa T1
18.	Senusret II	Khakheperre	sw t n A45 < ra xa xpr > mAa T1
19.	Senusret III	Khakhaure	sw t n A43 < ra xa kA > mAa T1
20.	Amenemhat III	(Nimaat)re	sw t n A45 < ra Sw n > mAa T1 or sw t n A45 < ra mAat n > mAa T1
21.	Amenemhat IV	Maakherure	sw t n A43 < ra U5 a xrw w > mAa T1
22.	Sobekneferu	Kasobekre	sw t n A45 < ra sbk kA > mAa T1

==== Sixth Dynasty ====
#	Pharaoh	Name written in the list	Hieroglyphs
23.	Pepi II Neferkare	Neferkare	sw t n A43 < ra nfr kA > mAa T1
24.	Merenre Nemtyemsaf I	Merenre	sw t n A45 < ra mr n > mAa T1
25.	Pepi I Meryre	Pepi	sw t n A43 < p p i i > mAa T1
26.	Teti	Teti	sw t n A45 < t t i > mAa T1

==== Fifth Dynasty ====
#	Pharaoh	Name written in the list	Hieroglyphs
27.	Unas	Unis	sw t n A44 < wn n i s > mAa T1
28.	Djedkare Isesi	Maatkare	sw t n A46 < ra Sw kA > mAa T1
29.	Menkauhor Kaiu	Menkauhor	sw t n A44 < G5 mn kA > mAa T1

=== Bottom row ===
==== Fifth Dynasty (Continued) ====
#	Pharaoh	Name written in the list	Hieroglyphs
30.	Neferefre	Khaneferre	sw t n A45 < ra xa nfr > mAa T1
31.	Shepseskare	Shepseskare	sw t n A43 < ra Spsi s s kA > mAa T1
32.	Neferirkare Kakai	Neferirkare	sw t n A45 < ra nfr ir kA > mAa T1
33.	Sahure	Sahure	sw t n A43 < ra D63 w > mAa T1
34.	Userkaf	Userka(f)	sw t n A45 < wsr s kA f > mAa T1

==== Fourth Dynasty ====
#	Pharaoh	Name written in the list	Hieroglyphs
35.	Names lost		
36.	Names lost		
37.	Names lost		
38.	Names lost		
39.	Names lost		
40.	Khafre	Khaf(re)	sw t n A45 < ra xa w f > mAa T1
41.	Djedefre	Djedefre	sw t n A43 < ra dd dd f > mAa T1
42.	Khufu	Khufu	sw t n A45 < x f w f > mAa T1
43.	Sneferu	Sneferu	sw t n A43 < s nfr f r w > mAa T1

==== Third Dynasty ====
#	Pharaoh	Name written in the list	Hieroglyphs
44.	Huni	Huni	sw t n A45 < H A21A n y D40 > mAa T1 or sw t n A45 < H A24 n y D40 > mAa T1 or sw t n A45 < H A25 n y D40 > mAa T1
45.	Nebka	Nebkare	sw t n A43 < ra nb kA > mAa T1
46.	Sekhemkhet	Djoser-teti	sw t n A45 < Dsr t t i > mAa T1
47.	Djoser	Djoser	sw t n A43 < Dsr r > mAa T1

==== Second Dynasty ====
#	Pharaoh	Name written in the list	Hieroglyphs
48.	Khasekhemwy	Bebti	sw t n A45 < b b N21 i i > mAa T1
49.	Hudjefa I	Hudjefa	sw t n A43 < f wSA HASH > mAa T1 or sw t n A43 < Hw D f wSA > mAa T1
50.	Sekhemib-Perenmaat?	Neferkasokar	sw t n A45 < z k r nfr kA > mAa T1
51.	Sneferka?	Neferkare	sw t n A43 < ra nfr kA > mAa T1
52.	Seth-Peribsen?	Senedj	sw t n A45 < snD > mAa T1
53.	Wadjenes	Wadjlas	sw t n A43 < wAD ns Z1 F51 > mAa T1
54.	Nynetjer	Banetjeru	sw t n A45 < W10A bA nTr X1 r w > mAa T1
55.	Nebra	Kakau	sw t n A43 < kA mt mt mt > mAa T1
56.	Hotepsekhemwy	Baunetjer	sw t n A46 < nTr G30 > mAa T1

==== First Dynasty ====
#	Pharaoh	Name written in the list	Hieroglyphs
57.	Qa'a	Qebehu	sw t n A44 < q b H w W15 > mAa T1
58.	Anedjib	Merbapen	sw t n A45 < U7 r W10A Z1 p n > mAa T1

=== Proposed reconstruction ===
As names 5-10 and 35-39 are missing or badly damaged, the following names are suggested to have once been listed here. Jürgen von Beckerath proposes king Nyuserre as the holder of cartouche #35; he thinks it is possible that Nyuserre was simply misplaced to the beginning of the 5th Dynasty. The Saqqara king list would therefore give the following succession: Khafre → Bikheris → Menkaure → Shepseskaf → Thamphthis → Nyuserrê → Userkaf. However, in recent years, it's been thought that the holder of cartouche #35 should actually be Queen Khentkaus; which would make the Saqqara king list succession be: Khafre → Bikheris → Menkaure → Shepseskaf → Thamphthis → Khentkaus → Userkaf. Note that this reconstruction is based on other kings lists and circumstantial evidence.

==== Upper row (Eighteenth Dynasty) ====
#	Pharaoh	Name likely written in the list	Possible hieroglyphs
5.	Amenhotep III	(Nebmaatre)	sw t n A43 < ra Sw nb > mAa T1 or sw t n A43 < ra mAat nb > mAa T1
6.	Thutmose IV	(Menkheperure)	sw t n A45 < ra mn xpr Z2 > mAa T1
7.	Amenhotep II	(Aakheperure)	sw t n A43 < ra aA xpr Z2 > mAa T1
8.	Thutmose III	(Menkheperre)	sw t n A45 < ra mn xpr > mAa T1
9.	Thutmose II	(Aakheperenre)	sw t n A43 < ra aA xpr n > mAa T1
10.	Thutmose I	(Aakheperkare)	sw t n A45 < ra aA xpr kA > mAa T1

==== Bottom row (Fourth Dynasty) ====
#	Pharaoh	Name likely written in the list	Possible hieroglyphs
35.	Nyuserre Ini or Khentkaus I	(Nyuserre)?, (Khentkaus)?	sw t n A43 < ra n wsr s r > mAa T1 (if Nyuserre) or sw t n A43 < xnt t kA kA kA > mAa T1 (if Khentkaus)
36.	Thamphthis?	(Djedefptah)?, (Djedefkaf)?, (Djedefhor)?	sw t n A45 < R11 f p t H > mAa T1 (if Djedefptah) or sw t n A45 < R11 f D28 I9 > mAa T1 (if Djedefkaf)
37.	Shepseskaf	(Shepseskaf)	sw t n A43 < Sps z z kA f > mAa T1
38.	Menkaure	(Menkaure)	sw t n A45 < ra mn kA kA kA > mAa T1
39.	Bikheris?	(Bakare)?, (Baufra)?	sw t n A43 < ra E10 kA > mAa T1

== Other New Kingdom royal lists ==
- Abydos King List
- Manetho King List
- Karnak King List
- Palermo Stone
- Ramesseum king list
- Turin King List
- Medinet Habu king list

== Bibliography ==
- Auguste Mariette: La table de Saqqarah in Revue Archeologique Vol 10, Paris 1864, p. 168-186, Pl. 17
- Emmanuel de Rougé: Album photographique de la mission remplie en Égypte, Paris 1865, Photographs, No. 143-145
- Auguste Mariette: Monuments divers recueillis en Égypte et en Nubie (Tables), Paris 1872, Vol. II, Pl. 58
- Eduard Meyer: Ägyptische Chronologie, Pl. 1, (Berlin 1904)
