= Barbara Bell (astronomer) =

American astronomer

- Born: April 1, 1922; Evanston, Illinois
- Died: September 25, 2017 (aged 95)
- Occupation: Astronomer

Barbara Bell (April 1, 1922 – September 25, 2017) was an American astronomer, affiliated with Harvard College Observatory, now the Center for Astrophysics | Harvard & Smithsonian, for her entire career. In addition to her work in astronomy, she contributed to the field of climate history, with studies of ancient Egypt.

== Early life and education ==
Bell was born in Evanston, Illinois, the daughter of George Irving Bell and Hazel Seerley Bell. She graduated from Radcliffe College in 1944, then earned a PhD in Astronomy from Harvard University in 1951. Her dissertation, "A study of Doppler and damping effects in the solar atmosphere", was supervised by Donald Menzel, and won the Caroline Wilby Prize in 1951. Her younger brother George Irving Bell Jr. was a biophysicist at Los Alamos National Laboratory.

Bell was said to have a sharp and curious mind, with a kind heart and cheerful disposition, especially towards her niece, Carolyn S. Bell.

== Career ==
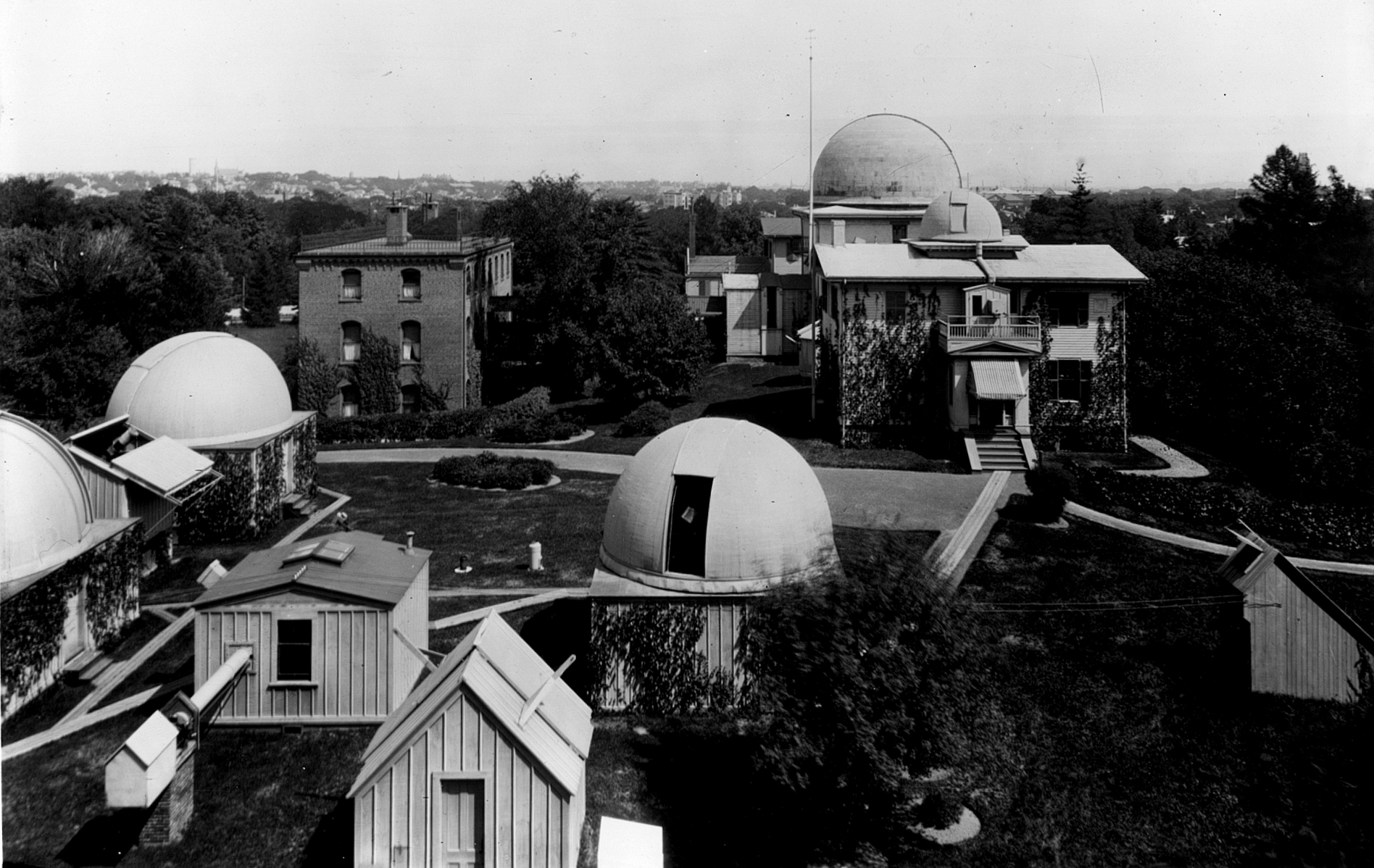
Grounds of Harvard College Observatory, where Bell worked

Bell was an astronomer affiliated with Harvard College Observatory and the Center for Astrophysics | Harvard & Smithsonian for over fifty years between 1948 and the 1990s working mainly on sunspots, geomagnetic storms, and other solar phenomena. She served on various committees of the International Astronomical Union.

Bell also researched and wrote on the climate history of ancient Egypt; she is credited with being the first to explore climate change as a cause of famine and civil breakdown known as "The First Dark Age in Egypt", using records of the Nile's annual flood levels. This research was published as a series of journal articles and has been used extensively in archeological literature.

== Publications ==
=== Astronomy and solar phenomena ===
- "Geomagnetism and the Emission-Line Corona" (1957, with Harold Glazer)
- "Sunspots and Geomagnetism" (1958)
- "Some Sunspot and Flare Statistics" (1958, with Harold Glazer)
- "The Doppler widths of solar absorption lines" (1959, with Alan Meltzer)
- "On the Magnetic Field Strengths of Sunspots" (1959)
- "On the Structure of the Sunspot Zone" (1960)
- "Major Flares and Geomagnetic Activity" (1961)
- "A long-term North-South asymmetry in the location of solar sources of great geomagnetic storms" (1962)
- "Solar radio bursts of spectral types II and IV: their relations to optical phenomena and to geomagnetic activity" (1963)
- "Lunar eclipses and the forecasting of solar minima" (1965, with John G. Wolbach)
- "Dependence of the lunar modulation of geomagnetic activity on the celestial latitude of the Moon" (1966, with Richard J. Defouw)
- "Research Directed Toward the Observation and Interpretation of Solar Phenomena" (1968, with Howard L. DeMastus and Donald Menzel)

=== Paleoclimatology ===
- "Solar variation as an explanation of climate change" (1953)
- "The Oldest Records of the Nile Floods" (1970)
- "The Dark Ages in History. I. The First Dark Age in Egypt" (1971)
- "Climate and the History of Egypt: The Middle Kingdom" (1975)
- "Analysis of Viticultural Data by Cumulative Deviations" (2014)

== Personal life and legacy ==
Bell, who was loved by all who knew her, died in 2017, aged 95 years. Following her wishes, Barbara was laid to rest next to her parents in Memorial Park Cemetery in Skokie, IL. The Barbara Bell Professor of Egyptology position at Harvard was named in her honor.
