= Second Dynasty of Egypt =

Dynasty of ancient Egypt

- c. 2890 BC–c. 2686 BC
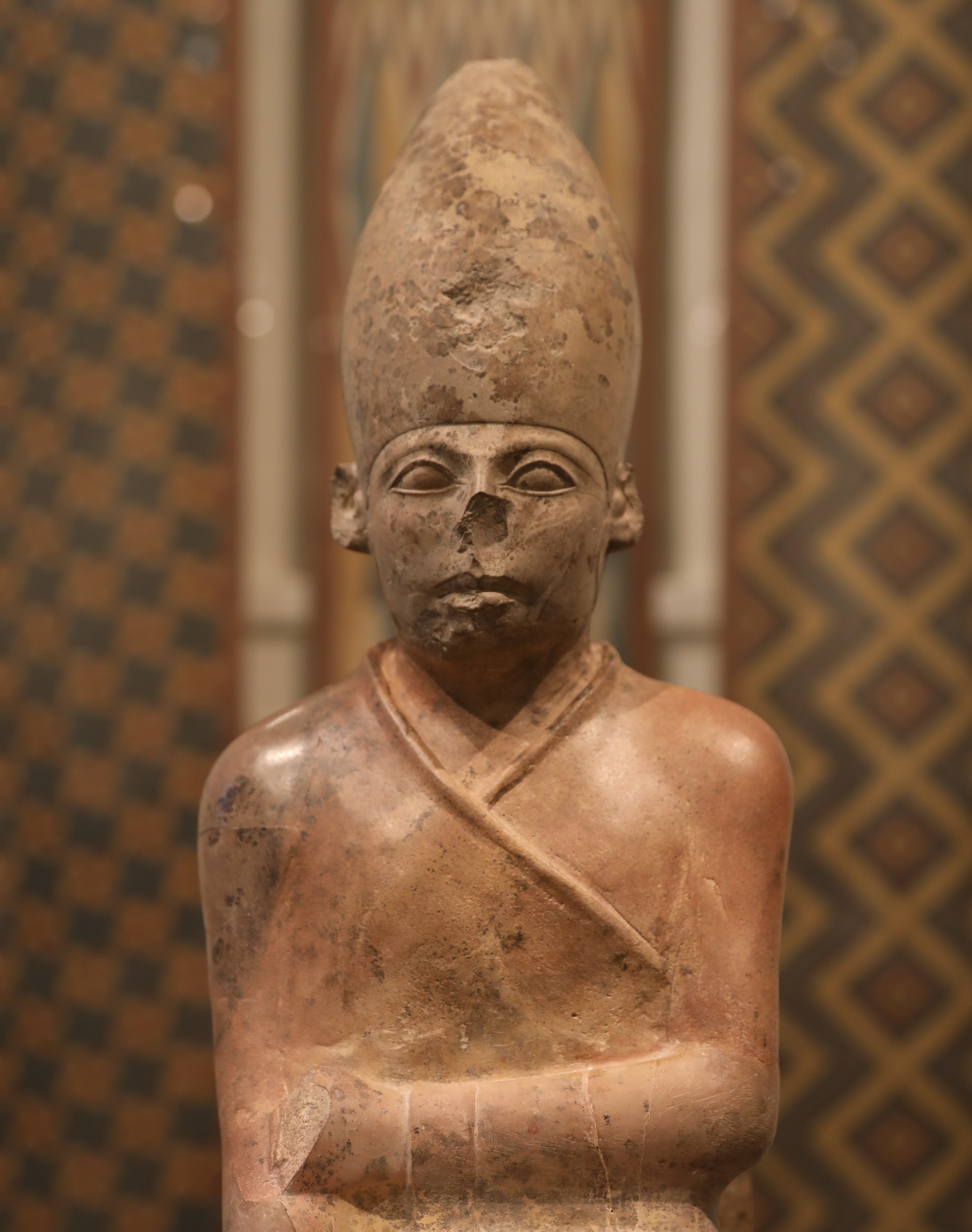
- Statue of Khasekhemwy, Ashmolean Museum
- Capital: Thinis
- Religion: ancient Egyptian religion
- Government: Absolute monarchy
- Historical era: Bronze Age
  - Established: c. 2890 BC
  - Disestablished: c. 2686 BC
Preceded by	Succeeded by
First Dynasty of Egypt	Third Dynasty of Egypt

The Second Dynasty of ancient Egypt (or Dynasty II, c. 2890 – c. 2686 BC) is the latter of the two dynasties of the Egyptian Archaic Period, when the seat of government was centred at Thinis. It is most known for its last ruler, Khasekhemwy, but is otherwise one of the most obscure periods in Egyptian history.

Though archaeological evidence of the time is very scant, contrasting data from the First and Third Dynasties indicates important institutional and economic developments during the Second Dynasty.

== Writing ==
The Second Dynasty of Egypt sees the advent of the first known complete sentences in Egyptian hieroglyphs. Probably the first known such sentence is a seal impression from Peribsen's tomb, at the end of the Second Dynasty, dating to ca. 2660–2650 BC. The sentence relates to the unification of Egypt: “Sealing of everything of Ombos (i.e., Naqada): He of Ombos has joined the Two Lands for his son, the Dual King Peribsen.”

== Conflicts ==
The base of a lime statue of king Khasekhemwy has depictions of killed enemies on its four sides, recording a military campaign against the 'northern rebels', referring to the inhabitants of the Nile Delta. On the front, the number of slain enemies is given as 47,209 dead, with a symbol generally considered as designating "Libyans". This scene seems to record the victory of King Khasekhemwy over a northern Egyptian population led by their ruler, Besh. The name Besh may be a variation or nomen of Peribsen, or more probably the name of a Libyan northern tribe near the Fayum. This iconography of the king crushing enemies at his feet would remain a central theme of royal iconography for the next three millennia.

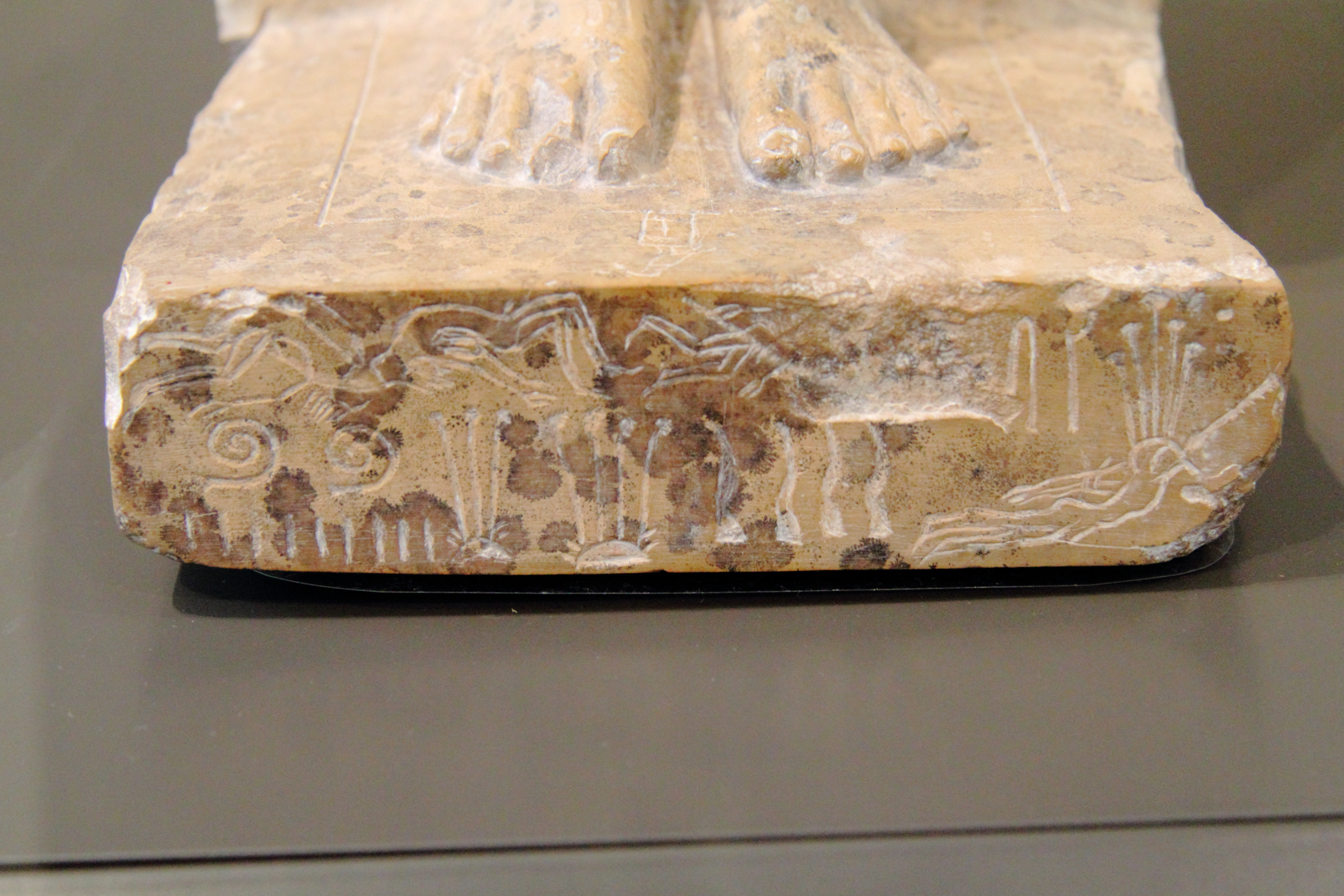
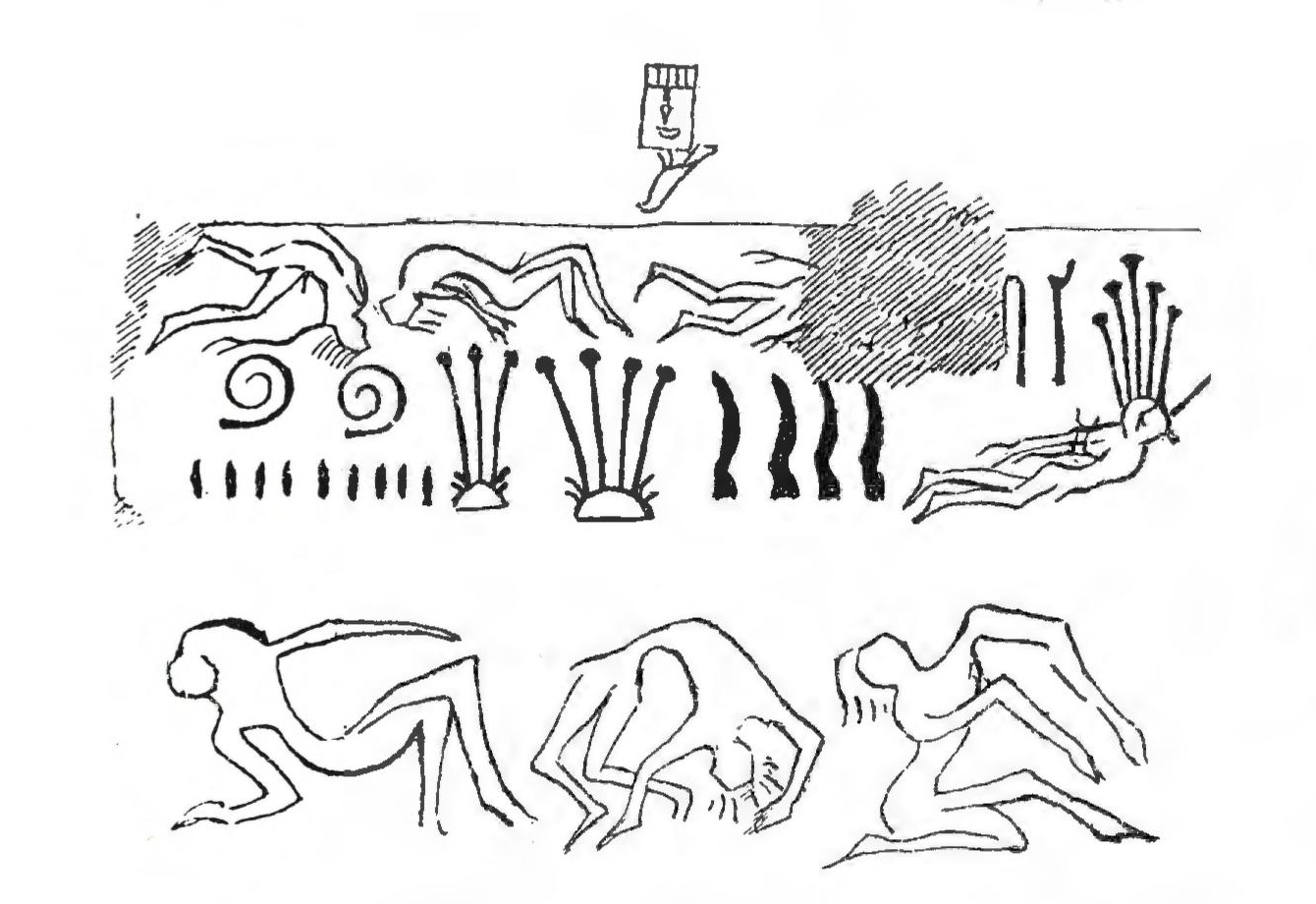
Base of the statue of Khasekhemwy with depiction of slain enemies. Hierakonpolis, 2700-2686 BC (Ashmolean Museum)

== Rulers ==
For the first three pharaohs, sources are fairly close in agreement and the order is supported by an inscription on the statuette of Hetepdief, who served in the mortuary cults of these three kings.

Name	Portrait	Years Reigned	Burial
Hotepsekhemwy		25–29	Gallery Tomb A, Saqqara?
Nebra (also known as Kakau)		10–14	Gallery Tomb A, Saqqara?
Nynetjer		40	Gallery Tomb B, Saqqara

But the identity of the next few rulers is unclear. Surviving sources might be giving the Horus name or the Nebty name and the birth names of these rulers. They may also be entirely different individuals, or could be legendary names. This might never be resolved.

It has been theorised that following the reign of Nynetjer, the country was split and ruled by two successors due to the overly complex state administration of the whole of Egypt.

The following list contains various king names from different sources:

Name	Years reigned (Manetho)	Notes	Burial
Weneg / Wadjenes	17	Listed as the fourth king of the dynasty on the Turin, Saqqara and Abydos king lists. Only attested in Lower Egypt. Weneg is generally accepted as a nebti (or throne) name and it is unknown what his horus name was. Wadjenes is believed to have been a Ramesside misinterpretation of the hieroglyphic sign for Weneg. Theorised to be the same person as Nebra, Sekhemib-Perenmaat or a completely separate king from the others of the Second dynasty. Known as Tlas in Manetho's Aegyptica.	
Senedj	41	Listed as the fifth king of the dynasty on the Turin, Saqqara and Abydos king lists. Horus name unknown. Theorised to be the same person as Horus Sa or Peribsen. Known as Sethenes in Manetho's Aegyptica.	Tomb P, Umm El Qa'ab (?)
Neferkara I	17	Only attested in later documents dated long after the time period of the Second dynasty. Listed as the sixth king of the dynasty in the Saqqara and Turin King lists, but omitted from the Abydos King List. May have only ruled Lower Egypt. Known as Khaires in Manetho's Aegyptica.	
Neferkasokar	25	Only attested in later documents dated long after the time period of the Second dynasty. Listed as the seventh king of the dynasty in the Saqqara and Turin King lists, but omitted from the Abydos King List. May have only ruled Lower Egypt. Known as Nephercheres in Manetho's Aegyptica.	
Hudjefa I	48	Name literally means "erased" or "missing", showing that this king's name was unknown or lost by the Nineteenth Dynasty. Listed as the eighth king of the dynasty on the Saqqara Tablet, but omitted from the Abydos King List. May have only ruled Lower Egypt. Theorised to be the same person as Peribsen and may have been deliberately omitted. Known as Sesochris in Manetho's Aegyptica.	
Seth-Peribsen	?	Name connected to Seth deity rather than the traditional Horus. Attested by contemporary inscriptions, but not on later king lists. Only attested in Upper Egypt.	Tomb P, Umm El Qa'ab
Sekhemib-Perenmaat	?	Attested by contemporary inscriptions, but not on later king lists. May be the same person as Seth-Peribsen or his immediate successor.	Tomb P, Umm El Qa'ab (?)
Nubnefer	?	Birth name of a king, unknown placement. Name does not appear on any known official king lists. May be birth name of Nebra or a completely separate ephemeral king who ruled at some point following Nynetjer's reign.	

With the last ruler, the sources return to an agreement:

Name	Years Reigned	Notes	Burial	Consort(s)
Khasekhemwy	17–18	Known as Kheneres in Manetho's Aegyptica. Reigned for 30 years according to Manetho. His serekh name is unique for presenting both Horus and Set, as it commemorates his achievement of reunifying Egypt. He was one of Egypt's first master builders, his funerary enclosure known as Shunet-ez-Zebib is a colossal mudbrick structure.	Tomb V, Umm El Qa'ab	Nimaathap

Manetho states Thinis was the capital, as in the First Dynasty, but the first three kings were buried at Saqqara, suggesting the center of power had moved to Memphis. Beyond this, little can be said about the events during this period as the annual records on the Palermo stone only survive to the end of the reign of Nebra and for parts of Nynetjer's. One important event, the unification of Upper and Lower Egypt, might have occurred during the reign of Khasekhemwy as many Egyptologists read his name as "the Two Powers arise".

== Comparison of regnal lists ==
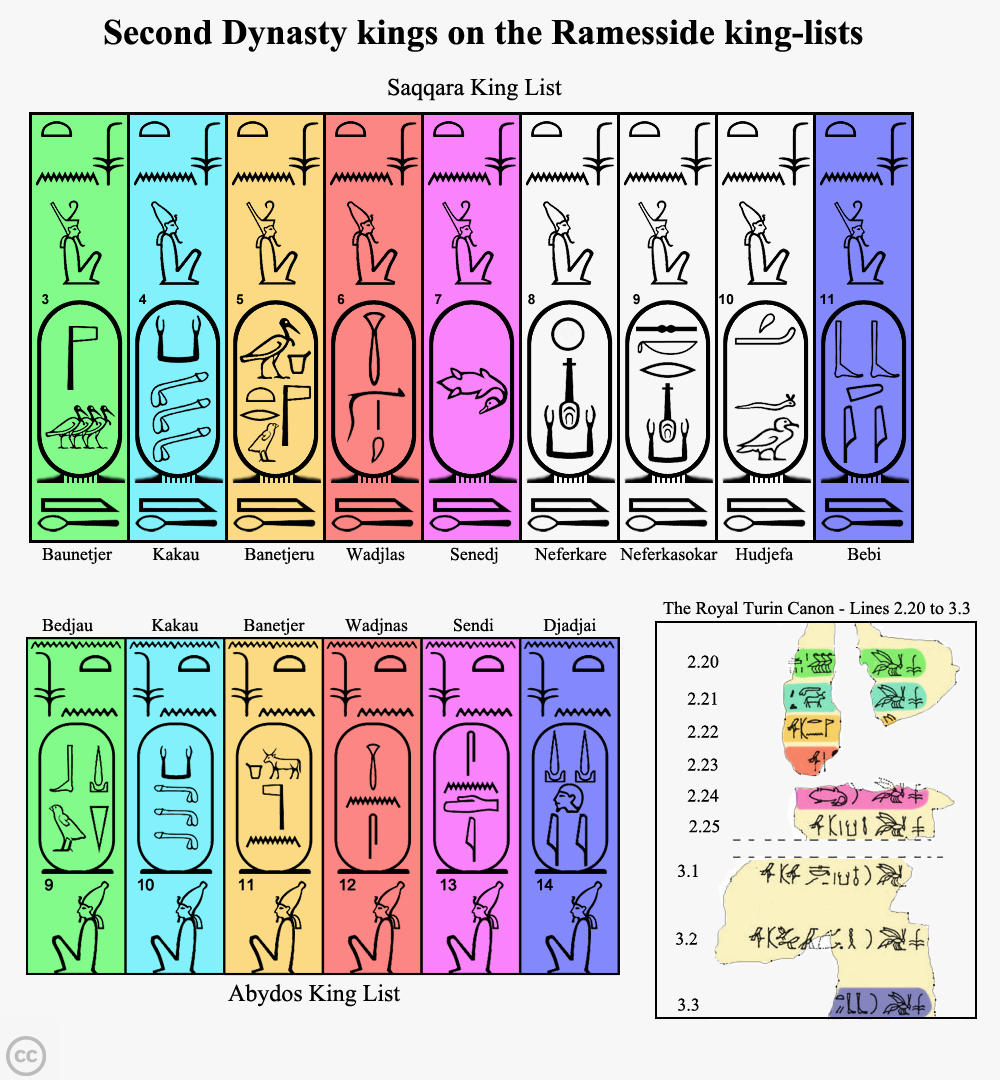

The surviving Turin, Abydos and Saqqara king lists, all from the New Kingdom of Egypt, provide a list of kings of this dynasty, though the Abydos list omits Neferkara, Neferkasokar, and Hudjefa I.

Historical Pharaoh	Abydos King List	Saqqara Tablet	Turin King List	Manetho
Hotepsekhemwy	Bedjau	Baunetjer	Baunetjer	Boethos
Nebra	Kakau	Kakau	Kakau	Kaiekhos
Nynetjer	Banetjer	Banetjeru	Banetjer	Binothris
Weneg	Wadjnas	Wadjlas	[...]s	Tlas
Senedj	Sendi	Senedj	Sened[...]	Sethenes
Neferkara I	–	Neferkare	Neferka	Khaires
Neferkasokar	–	Neferkasokar	Neferkasokar	Nephercheres
Hudjefa	–	Hudjefa	–	Sesochris
Khasekhemwy	Djadjay	Bebti	Bebti	Kheneres

== See also ==
- Dynasties of ancient Egypt
- Early Dynastic Period (Egypt)
- Predynastic Egypt

Preceded by First Dynasty	Dynasty of Egypt c. 2890 – 2686 BC	Succeeded by Third Dynasty
