= Neithhotep =

Ancient Egyptian queen consort

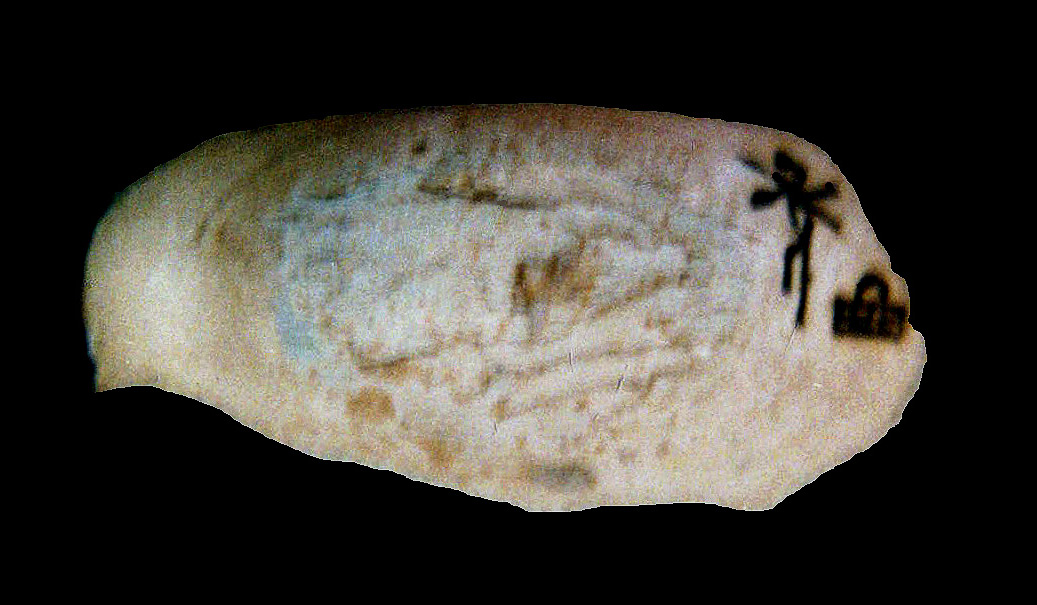
- Alabaster fragment with the name of queen Neith-hotep, Egyptian Museum

Queen consort of Egypt
- Tenure: c. 3050 BC
- Died: c. 3050 BC
- Burial: Naqada, Qena, Egypt

Neithhotep in hieroglyphs
Personal name:
R24 R4
Neith-hotep/Hotep-Neith
nt-ḥtp
"Neith is merciful"

Neithhotep or Neith-hotep (fl. c. 3050 BC) was an ancient Egyptian queen consort who lived and ruled during the early First Dynasty. Archaeological evidence indicates she may have ruled as pharaoh in her own right, and as such would have been the earliest known female monarch in history. She was subsequently considered to be the wife of unified Egypt's first pharaoh, Narmer, and the mother of Hor-Aha. She was once wrongfully thought to be a male ruler: her outstandingly large mastaba and the royal serekh surrounding her name on several seal impressions previously led Egyptologists and historians to the erroneous belief that she might have been an unknown king. As the understanding of early Egyptian writings developed, scholars learned that Neithhotep was in fact a woman of extraordinary rank.

== Identity ==
=== Name ===
Neith, the goddess of war and hunting which originated among the Libyans where her cult center in Sais and main temple was, Sais was also the capital where Neithhotep ruled. This followed a tradition notably practiced during the first dynasty: many queens (such as Merneith/Meritneith, another possible female pharaoh and descendant of Neithhotep) and princesses (such as Aha-Neith, Her-Neith, Nakht-Neith and Qa'-Neith) also had names referencing the deity.

=== Titles ===
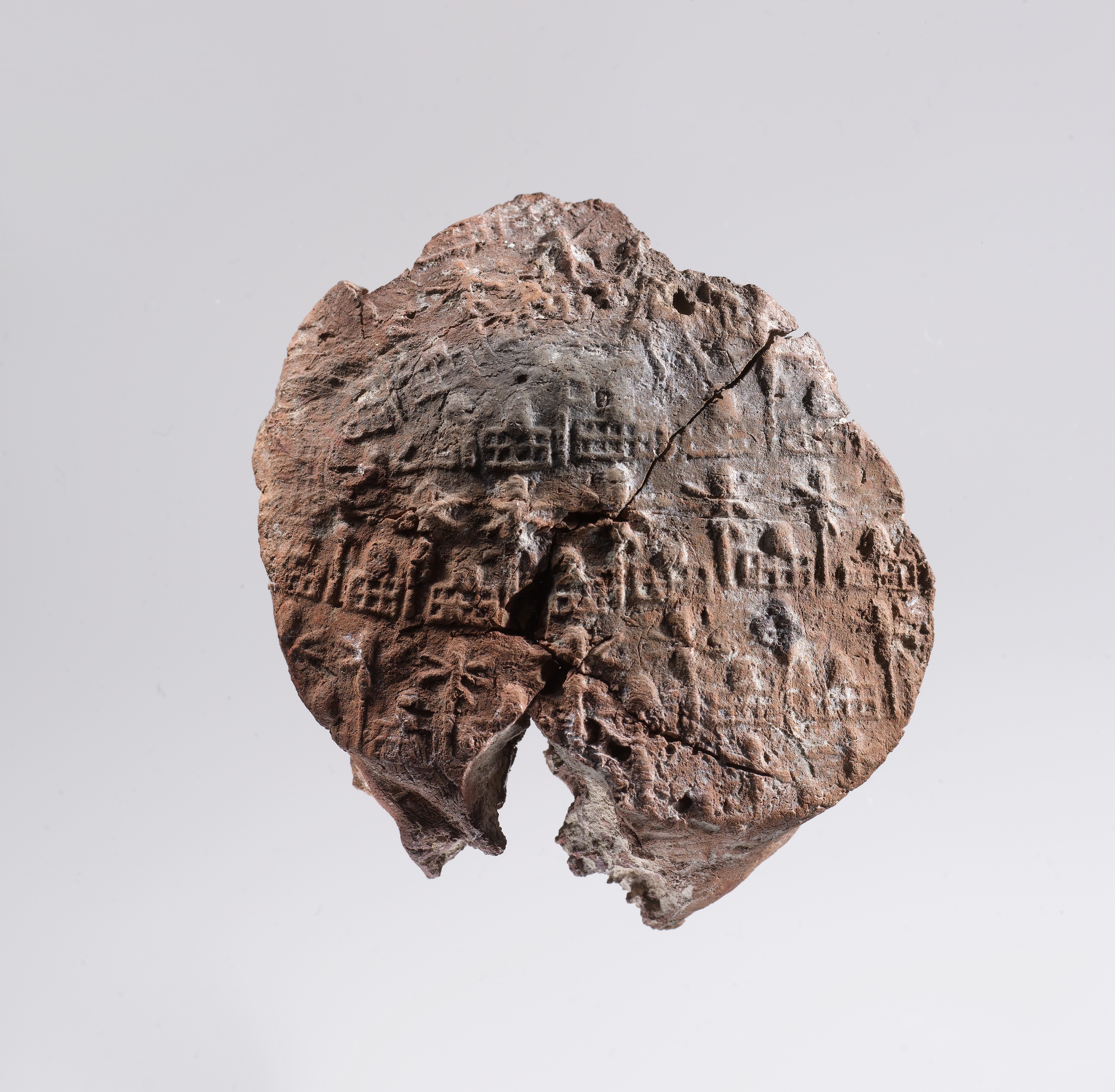
Jar sealing impressed with name of Queen Neithhotep. Metropolitan Museum of Art

Tyldesley reports "Foremost of the Women" and Consort of the Two Ladies as titles for Neithhotep.

It is possible that Neithhotep bore more royal titles, but these haven't yet been discovered. At the time Neithhotep ruled, many royal titles for kings and queens had not yet been introduced. At this early state of hieroglyphic development, the early Egyptians may not have known how to express certain titles. Alternatively, the belief in the dynastic roles of queens was different from what it was in Meritneith's time.

=== Attestations ===
Neithhotep's name was found at Helwan, Abydos and Naqada. It appears on clay seal impressions, on ivory tags, and as inscriptions on stone bowls. Most of the objects were found in her burial complex and in the tombs of Aha and Djer. On several clay seals, Neithhotep's name was written inside a double serekh, and between the merged serekhs perches the divine standard of Neith. One unusual seal impression gives the name Hetepjw.

=== New discoveries ===
A new discovery site of Neithhotep's name lies in the Wadi Ameyra at the Sinai Peninsula. At the site, several rock carvings date to the kings Iry-Hor, Narmer, Djer and Nebra. King Djer's inscription depicts at its left a procession of royal festive boats, at the right a royal serekh with Djer's name inside. The Horus-falcon atop the serekh holds a war mace, clubbing a kneeling foe. Neithhotep's name appears at the left side diagonally above the serekh.

== Historical evaluations ==
After the discovery of her mastaba, Neithhotep was thought to be a male ruler: her outstandingly large tomb and the royal serekh bearing her name on several seal impressions led Egyptologists and historians to the erroneous belief that she might have been a yet unknown king. However, as the understanding of early Egyptian writings developed, scholars learned that Neithhotep was in fact a female noble of extraordinary rank. Along with this realization, scholars viewed her now as the wife of king Narmer and mother of Hor-Aha. This view was promoted by clay seal impressions found in her tomb showing the serekhs of Narmer and Aha.

Neithhotep's name appears on several clay seal impressions inside a serekh – a fashion that was commonly reserved for male rulers only. Secondly, her tomb is of extraordinary size and it has its own cultic enclosure. Such a case is otherwise known only from queen Meritneith. Thirdly are the Wadi Ameyra inscriptions themselves: these reveal that Neithhotep arranged and ordered an expedition through the Wadi in attempt to mine ore and harvest feedstocks. But such an act commonly required royal powers that a mere queen consort didn't have – not unless she was in fact an independent, fully authorized ruler.

The case of queen Neithhotep shows astonishing similarities to that of queen Meritneith, who had held the royal office for her still minor son, king Hor Den. This realization lead Egyptologists now to the theory that Queen Neithhotep may have also held the royal office for an infant child king as some kind of substitute king. Such an act is now known to have been fairly common in early Egyptian times. Royal dynasties were founded in early times by royal mothers, not by inheritance from father to son.

Some scholars even believe that Neithhotep may be identical to a king Teti listed in the Ramesside king lists and indirectly mentioned on the famous Palermo Stone. The Palermo Stone provides an interregnum between king Aha and Djer by mentioning a "double date of death" in column I of the event years. The discrepancy between the date of death for Hor-Aha and the second death note spans around 1 month and 15 days. Such a time span seems too short for a "real" ruler such as Hor-Aha, Djer or Wadj. It would rather fit someone who ruled as a substitute for the original pharaoh. And this, in turn, is now proven for Queen Neithhotep. Thus, the entry on the Palermo Stone may indeed be a reference to the interregnum of Queen Neithhotep. This would also explain why no contemporary artifact from the 1st Dynasty mentions the royal name Teti, but the others (Itetj and Ita).

Equating Queen Neithhotep with Teti I is not commonly accepted. Egyptologists such as Werner Kaiser and Walter B. Emery point to several clay seal fragments with the Horus names of all kings from Narmer to Den. Such seals were discovered in Den's and Queen Meritneith's tombs and they all consequently begin their list with Narmer, who was the husband of Neithhotep. Kaiser and Emery see this as evidence that it was Narmer, not Hor-Aha, who started the First Dynasty. In addition, Kaiser points to seal fragments which mention the name Menj beside the serekh of Narmer. Thus, it is at least likewise possible that Narmer is identical to king Menes. This, in turn, would mean that the cartouche name "Teti" belongs to Hor-Aha, not to Queen Neithhotep.

== Tomb ==
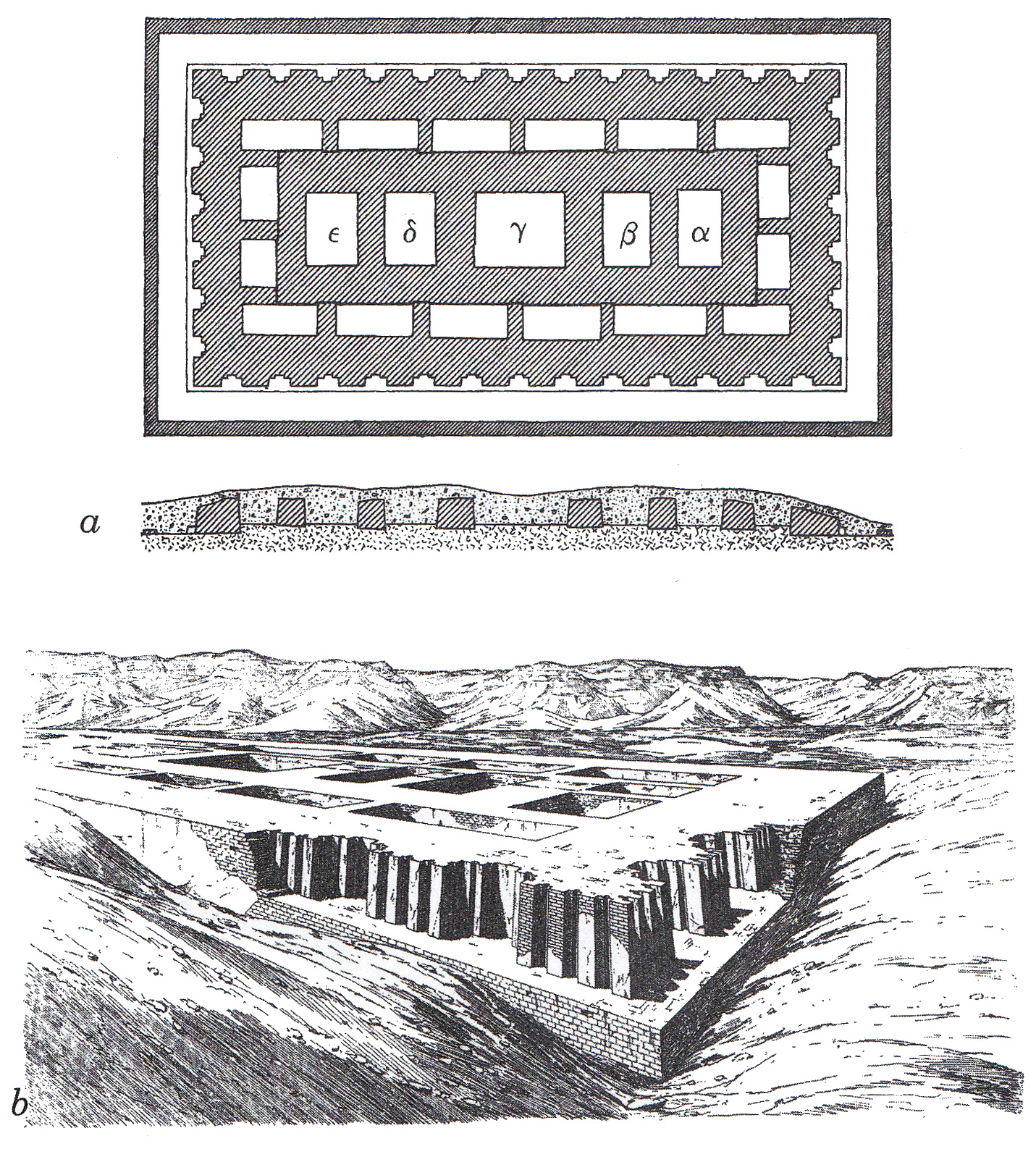
Mastaba attributed to Neithhotep which is believed to have been built by Hor-Aha.

Neithhotep's tomb was discovered in 1897 by French archaeologist Jacques de Morgan at the site of Naqada, who spent just 15 days excavating the structure. The tomb was investigated again by German archaeologist Ludwig Borchardt in 1898. John Garstang re-excavated the tomb in 1904 and uncovered hundreds of objects left behind by the previous excavations, around two hundred of which are now housed in the Garstang Museum at the University of Liverpool.

The superstructure consisted of a huge mastaba made of hardened mudbricks, of which the outer walls were niched. It is now completely destroyed due to time-conditional erosion. Because of its huge size the tomb was once believed to be that of King Menes. The choice of place for the tomb may indicate that Neithhotep had connections to the ruling elite of a power centre based at Naqada, rather than coming from Lower Egypt, as has been traditionally assumed. It was once believed that Neithhotep married Narmer in an attempt to facilitate Narmer's unification of Egypt.
