= Djer =

First-dynasty pharaoh of Egypt

- Zher, Sekhty
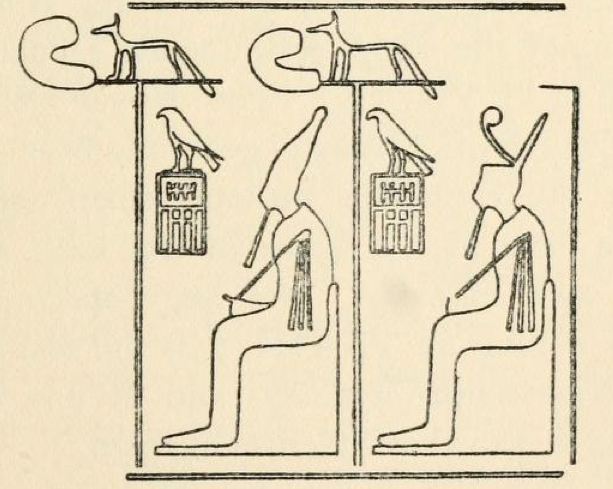
- Cylinder seal impression depicting Djer before canine standards wearing the Hedjet and Deshret crowns and holding the flail

Pharaoh
- Reign: c. 40 years, c. 3000 BC
- Predecessor: Hor-Aha or Menes
- Successor: Djet
Royal titulary
Horus name
Djer
ḏr
Horus, the Defender
Alternative translation:
He who defends (against the enemies) for Horus
G5	M37
Golden Horus
Cairo stone (5th dynasty)
Nynebu
nj-nbw
He who belongs to the Golden One
G8	n nbw
Prenomen
Nisut-Bity-Itetj
nsw.t-bjtj-Jttj
King of Upper and Lower Egypt, the ruler has come
M23 t L2 t M17 U33 X1 Z4
Cairo stone (5th dynasty)
Itetj
Jttj
The ruler has come
< M17 U33 X1 Z4 >
Abydos King List
Itetj
Jttj
The ruler has come
< M17 X1 U33 >
Turin King List
It...
Jtj...
...damaged...
< M17 X1 HASH > G7
- Consorts: Nakhtneith, Herneith, Penebui
- Children: Merneith, Djet ?
- Father: Hor-Aha
- Mother: Khenthap ?, Neithhotep ?
- Burial: Tomb O, Umm el-Qa'ab
- Dynasty: First Dynasty

Djer (also Zer or Sekhty; fl. c. 3000 BC) is considered the third pharaoh of the First Dynasty of ancient Egypt in current Egyptology. He lived around the mid 31st century BC and reigned for about 40 years. A mummified forearm of Djer or his wife was discovered by Egyptologist Flinders Petrie, but was discarded by Émile Brugsch.

== Name ==
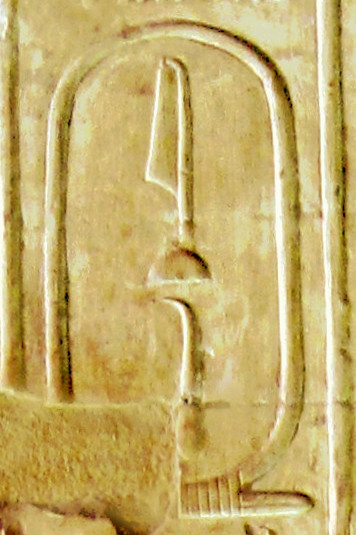
Iti, cartouche name of Djer in the Abydos King List.

Jürgen von Beckerath translates the hieroglyphs of "Djer" as "Defender of Horus." The King lists of the New Kingdom (13th century BC) record the third pharaoh as ꞽttꞽ, which is sometimes also translated as Iteti. The earliest names given in these lists are almost certainly later tradition, as throne names, the one used in official annals, are only attested from the reign of Den, the fifth pharaoh. In fact, it's possible that ꞽttꞽ is the result of a later scribe mistaking one of Djer's honorific (recorded in the Palermo Stone) as an actual name.

In the Aegyptiaca of the Egyptian priest Manetho (3rd century BC), the third pharaoh is recorded as Kenkenês (Κενκενης). I. E. S. Edwards theorized that this name actually refers to an alternate spelling of Den's throne name, which in turn led to other corruptions in the king list.

== Length of reign ==
According to the Roman historian Julius Africanus, Manetho wrote that the third pharaoh ruled 31 years. Modern reconstructions of the near-contemporary (and therefore, more accurate) Palermo Stone ascribes Djer a reign of at least 40 years. According to Toby Wilkinson, the annals record "41 complete or partial years." Wilkinson also notes that years 1–10 of Djer's reign are preserved in register II of the Palermo Stone, while the middle years of this pharaoh's reign are recorded in register II of Cairo stone fragment C1. However, this is not the only proposed reconstruction. Erik Hornung argues that the Palermo Stone records 47 years for Djer, while Wolfgang Helck proposes 54 years.

== Reign ==
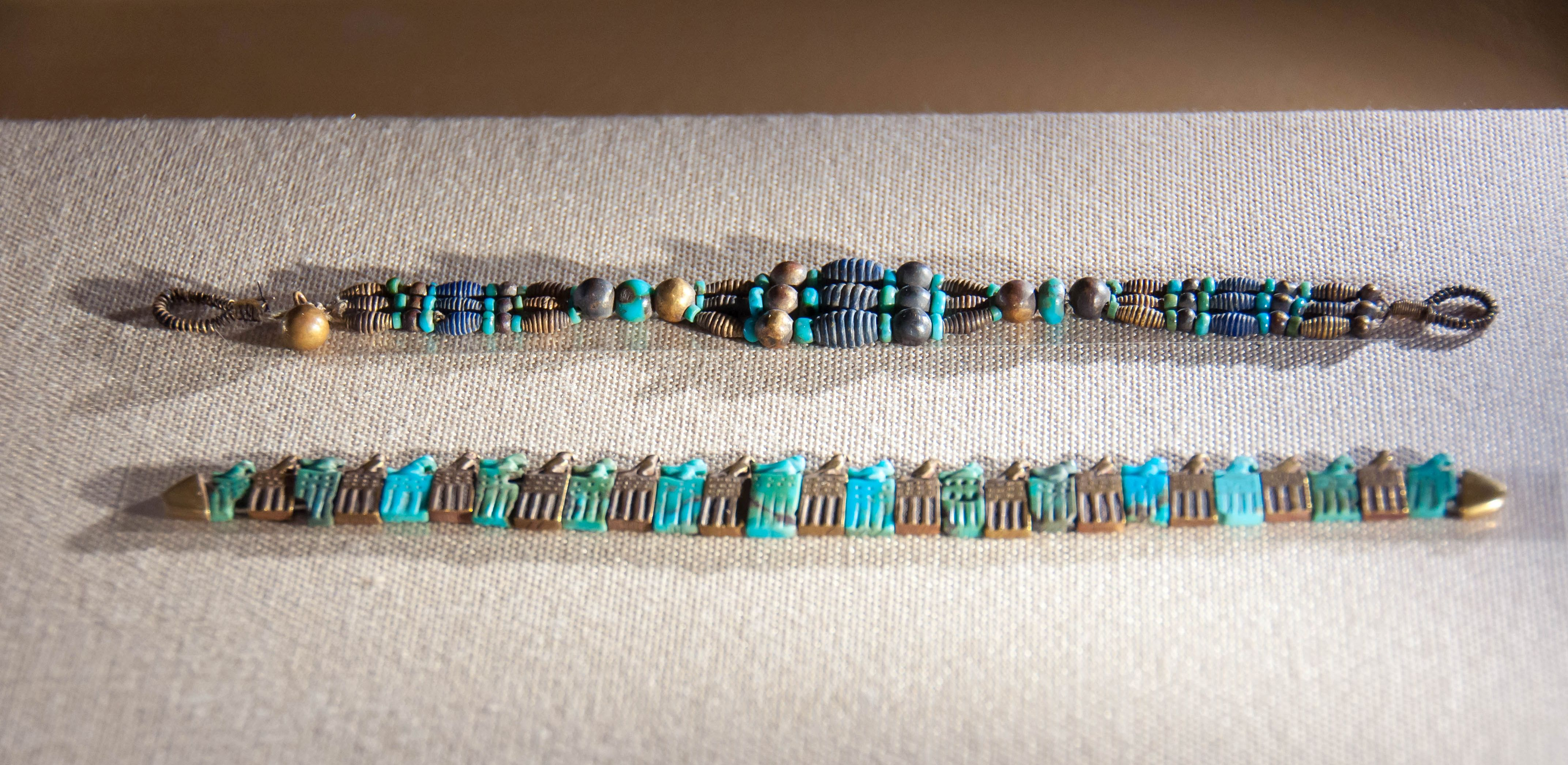
Djer's queen's bracelet is the only surviving royal jewellry of the early dynasty period of Egypt. It bears his royal serekh or name.

A view of all Four surviving royal bracelets from Djer's royal tomb now in the Grand Egyptian Museum.

Djer's reign was preceded by a regency controlled by Neithhotep, possibly his mother or grandmother.

The evidence for Djer's life and reign is:

- Tomb in Umm el-Qa'ab, Abydos
- Seal prints from graves 2185 and 3471 in Saqqara
- Inscriptions in graves 3503, 3506 and 3035 in Saqqara
- Seal impression and inscriptions from Helwan
- Jar from Turah with the name of Djer
- UC 16182 ivory tablet from Abydos, subsidiary tomb 612 of the enclosure of Djer
- UC 16172 copper adze with the name of Djer
- Inscription of his name (of questioned authenticity, however) at Wadi Halfa, Sudan

The inscriptions, on ivory and wood, are in a very early form of hieroglyphs, hindering complete translation, but a label at Saqqarah may depict the First Dynasty practice of human sacrifice. An ivory tablet from Abydos mentions that Djer visited Buto and Sais in the Nile Delta.

=== Year-by-year records ===
The Palermo stone lists the first nine years of Djer's reign, as well as the heights of the Nile for each.

- Year of coronation (1st year): 4 months and 13 days, uniting Upper and Lower Egypt, circumambulating the wall. Six cubits.
- 2nd year: Following of Horus, desher-festival.
- 3rd year: Creation of two royal children. Four cubits, one palm.
- 4th year: Following of Horus, censing a sacrificial victim. Five cubits, five palms, one finger.
- 5th year: The planning of the building "Companion of the Gods"; Sokar-festival. Five cubits, five palms, one finger.
- 6th year: Following of Horus, creating an image of Iat. Five cubits, one palm.
- 7th year: Appearance of the king as nwst, creating an image of Min. Five cubits.
- 8th year: Following of Horus, creating an image of Anubis. Six cubits, one palm.
- 9th year: First occasion of the Djet festival. Four cubits, one span.

It has been proposed by Wolfgang Helck that the person sacrificed in year 4 of his reign may have been Penebui, dying from decapitation, since the sign of a deceased royal lady in the year window is guided by the hieroglyph of a decapitated lapwing.

Cairo Stone, main fragment:

- 22nd year: Following of Horus, creating an image of Anubis. Seven cubits, (damaged) palms.
- 23rd year: Circumambulating the Two Lands, desher-festival. Seven cubits...
- 24th year: Following of Horus, creating an image of Thoth. Seven cubits...
- 25th year: The planning of the building "Companion of the Gods"; Sokar-festival. Four cubits.
- 26th year: Following of Horus, smiting the land of Setjet. Four cubits.
- 27th year: Appearance of the king of Lower and Upper Egypt, creating an image of Ha. Four cubits.
- 28th year: Following of Horus, creating an image of Neith. Three cubits.
- 29th year: Visit to the building "Companion of the Gods"; desher-festival. Five cubits.
- 30th year: Following of Horus, creating an image of Anubis. Four cubits.

Since the 30th year is the last surviving register for Djer's reign on the Cairo Stone, it suggests that the 31st year was when Djer celebrated his first Sed Festival.

=== Manetho ===
Manetho claimed that Athothes, who is sometimes identified as Djer, had written a treatise on anatomy that still existed in his own day, over two millennia later.

== Family ==
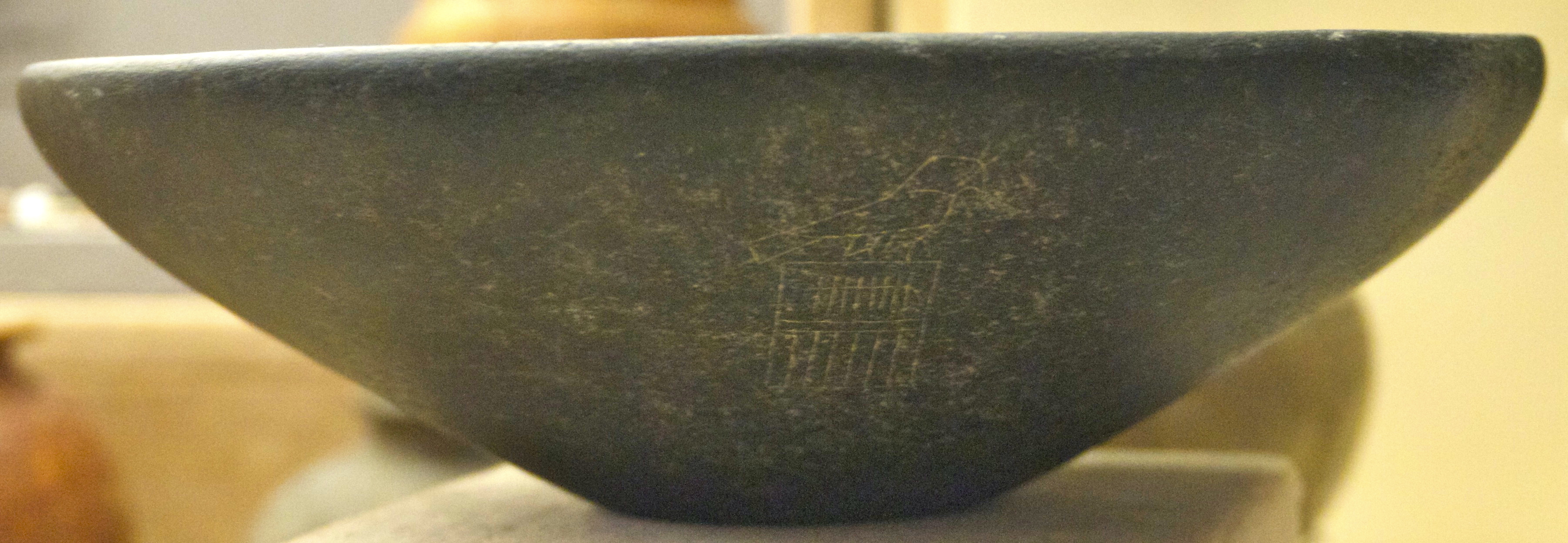
Stone vase bearing the serekh of Djer, National Archaeological Museum (France).

Djer was a son of Hor-Aha and a grandson of Narmer. Djer fathered Merneith, wife of Djet and mother of Den. Women carrying titles later associated with queens such as Great One of the Hetes-Sceptre and She who Sees/Carries Horus were buried in subsidiary tombs near the tomb of Djer in Abydos or attested in Saqqara. These women are thought to be the wives of Djer and include:

- Nakhtneith (or Nekhetneith), buried in Abydos and known from a stela.
- Herneith, possibly a wife of Djer. Buried in Saqqara.
- Seshemetka, buried in Abydos next to the king. She was said to be a wife of Den in Dodson and Hilton.
- Penebui, her name and title were found on an ivory label from Saqqara.
- bsu, known from a label in Saqqara and several stone vessels (reading of name uncertain; name consists of three fish hieroglyphs).

== Tomb ==
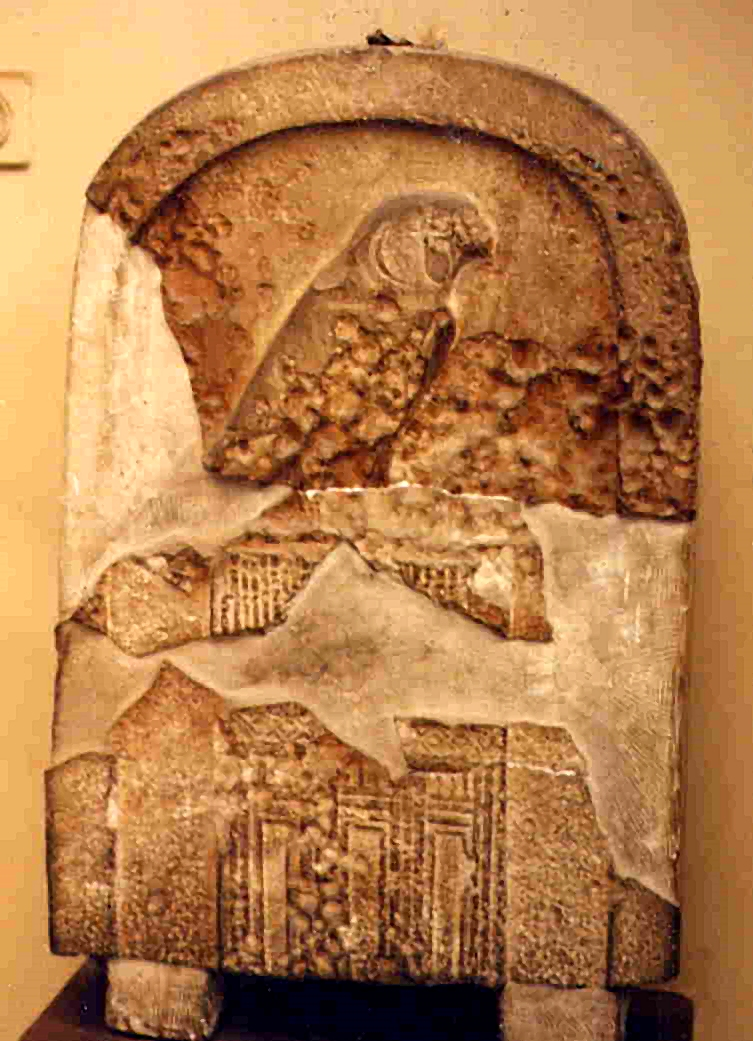
Tomb stela of Djer,Egyptian Museum,Cairo

Similarly to his father Hor-Aha, Djer was buried in Umm el-Qa'ab at Abydos. Djer's tomb is tomb O of Petrie. His tomb contains the remains of 318 retainers who were buried with him. At some point, Djer's tomb was devastated by fire, possibly as early as the Second Dynasty. During the Middle Kingdom, the tomb of Djer was revered as the tomb of Osiris, and the entire First Dynasty burial complex, which includes the tomb of Djer, was very important in the Egyptian religious tradition. An image of Osiris on a funerary bier was placed in the tomb, possibly by the Thirteenth dynasty pharaoh Djedkheperu.

Several objects were found in and around the tomb of Djer:

- A stela of Djer, now in the Cairo Museum, probably comes from Abydos.
- Labels mentioning the name of a palace and the name of Meritneith.
- Fragments of two vases inscribed with the name of Queen Neithhotep.
- Bracelets of a Queen were found in the wall of the tomb.

In the subsidiary tombs, excavators found objects including stelae representing several individuals, ivory objects inscribed with the name of Neithhotep, and various ivory tablets.

Manetho indicates that the First Dynasty ruled from Memphis – and indeed Herneith, one of Djer's wives, was buried nearby at Saqqara.

== Gallery ==
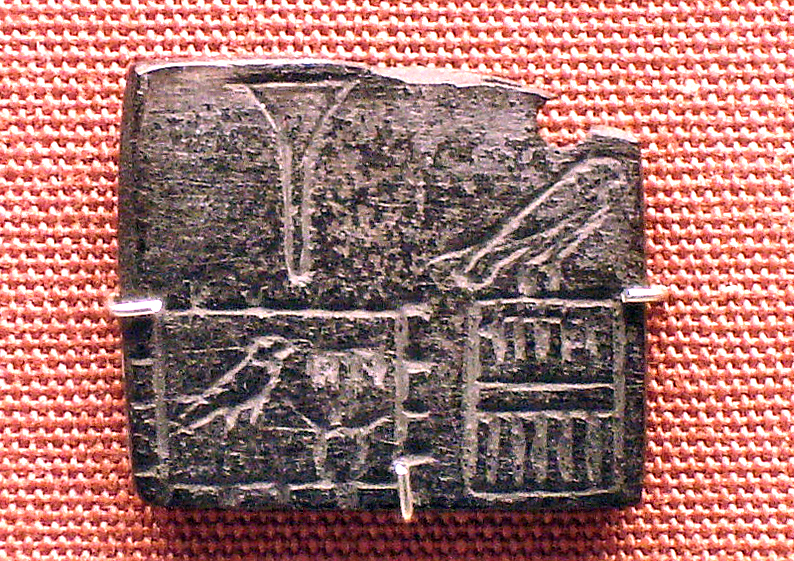
Small ivory label of Djer mentioning the name of a fortress or domain of the king "Hor-Djer-ib".British Museum(Catalogue number EA35524)

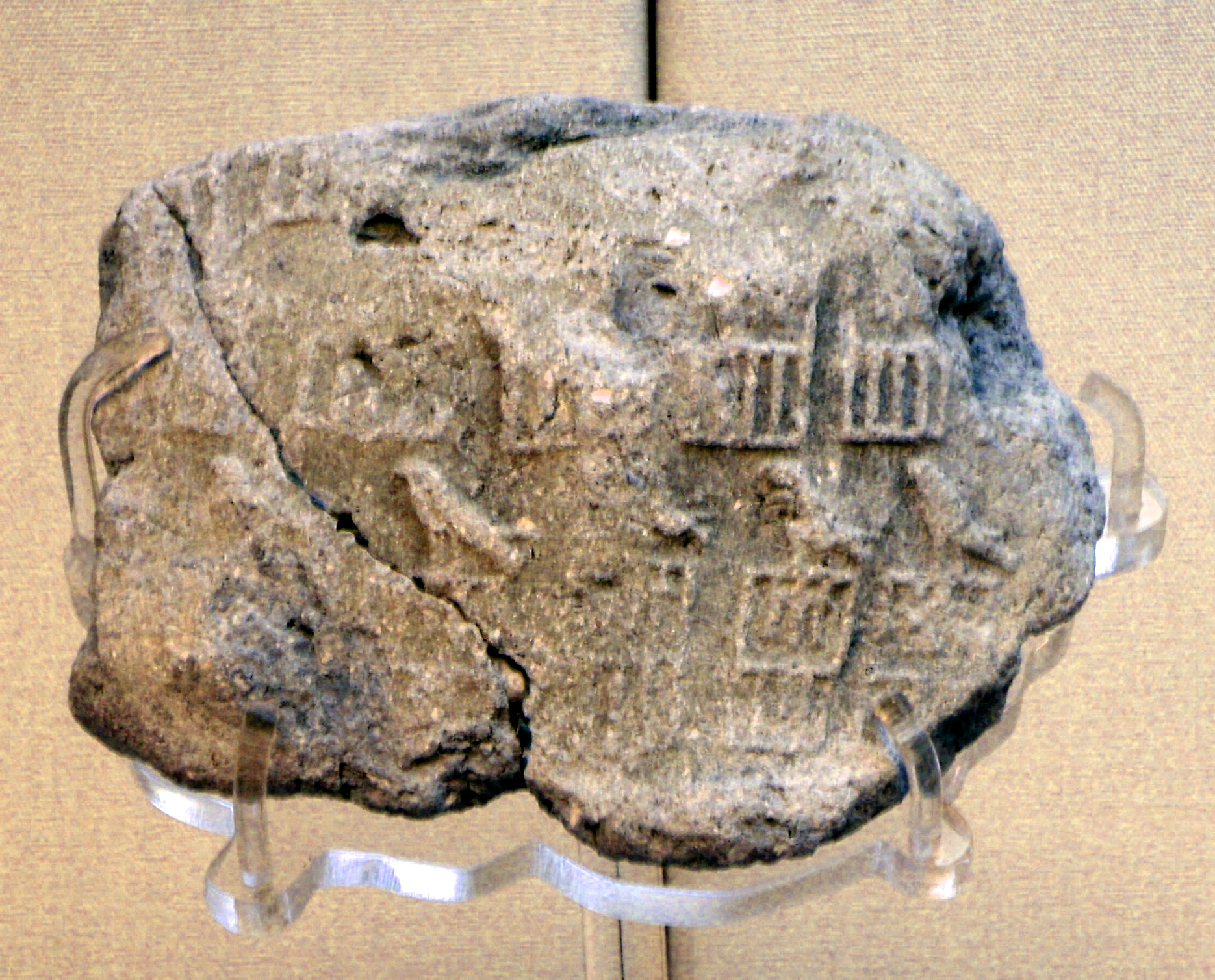
Seal impression with the serekh of Djer found in Abydos, on display at the British Museum

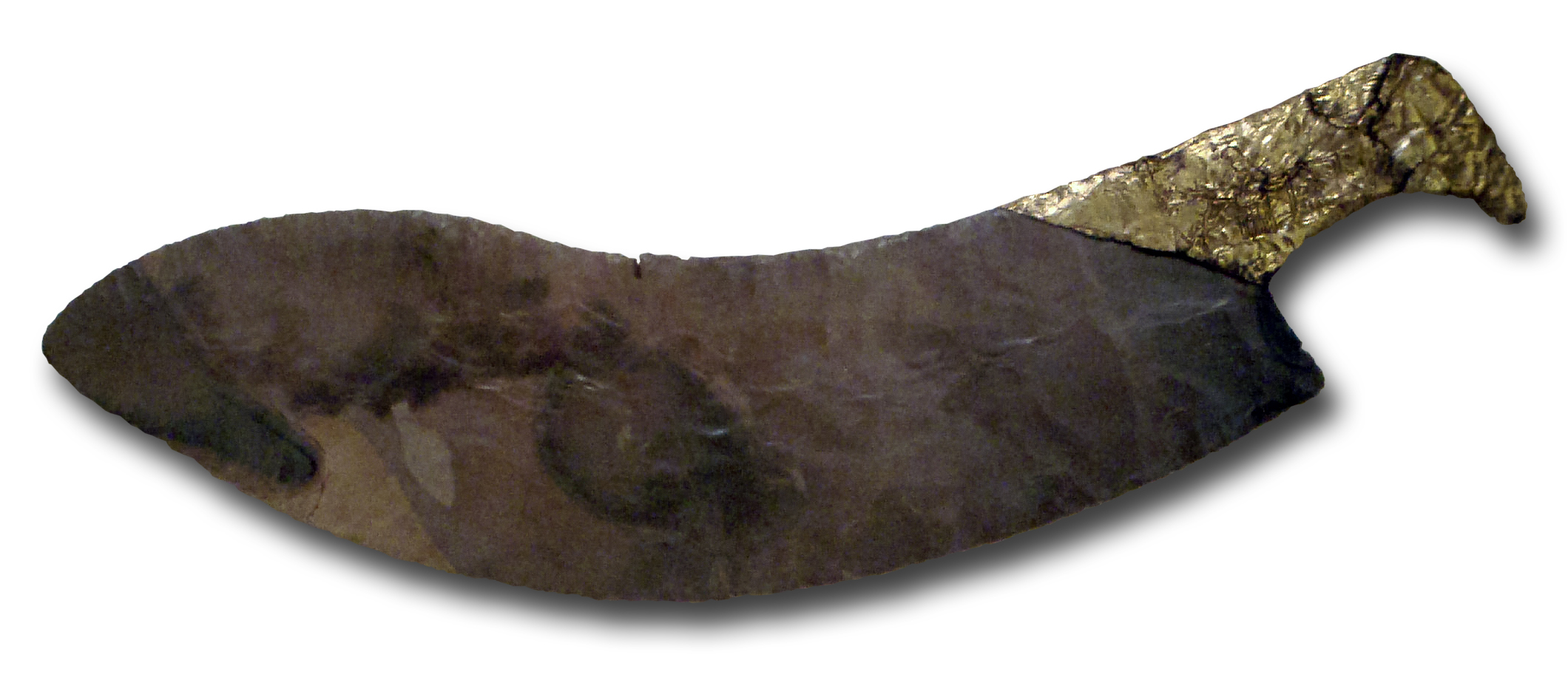
Ceremonial flint knife with the Horus name of Djer inscribed on its gold handle, on display at the Royal Ontario Museum.

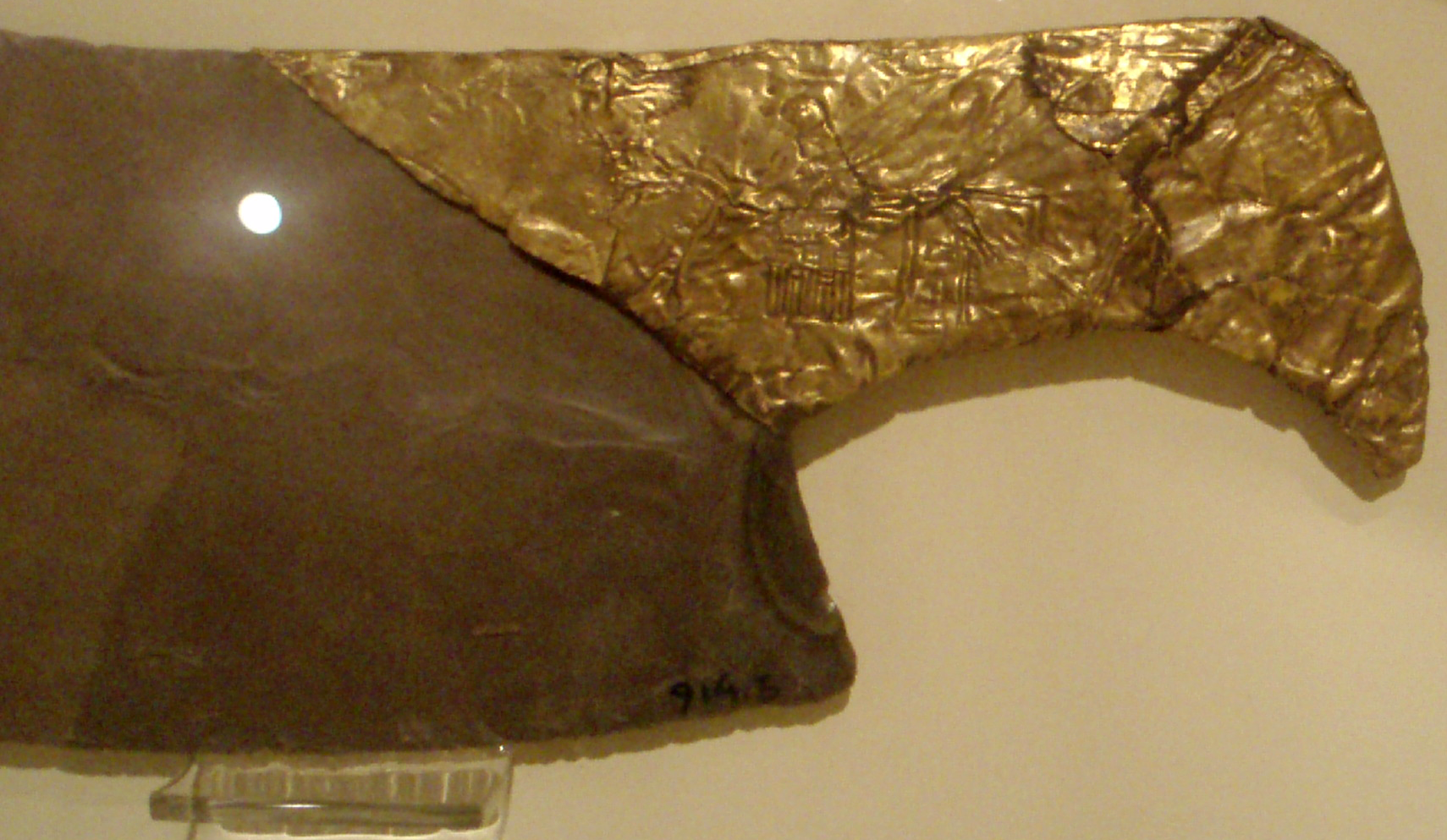
Close-up view of Djer's serekh on the ceremonial flint knife of the Royal Ontario Museum.

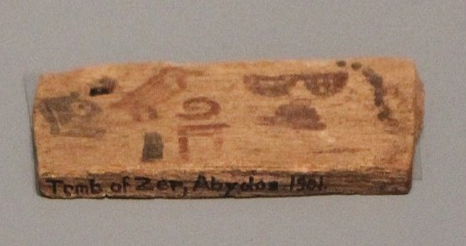
Label from Tomb of King Djer, Abydos, now in the Ashmolean Museum

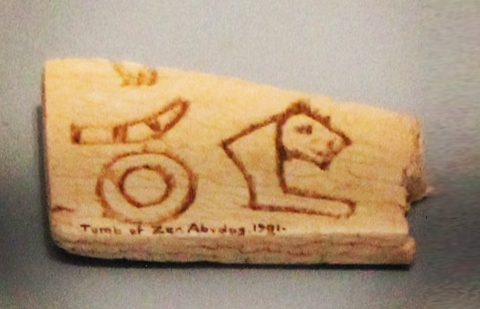
Label from Tomb of King Djer, Abydos,now in the Ashmolean Museum

== See also ==
- Ancient Egyptian retainer sacrifices
- List of pharaohs

== Bibliography ==
- Wilkinson, Toby (2005) [1999]. Early dynastic Egypt (PDF) (2nd ed.). Routledge. pp. 71–73. ISBN 978-0-203-02438-6.

Preceded by Neithhotep (regent)	Pharaoh of Egypt c. 3000 BC	Succeeded by Djet
