= Penebui =

Early Queen of Egypt

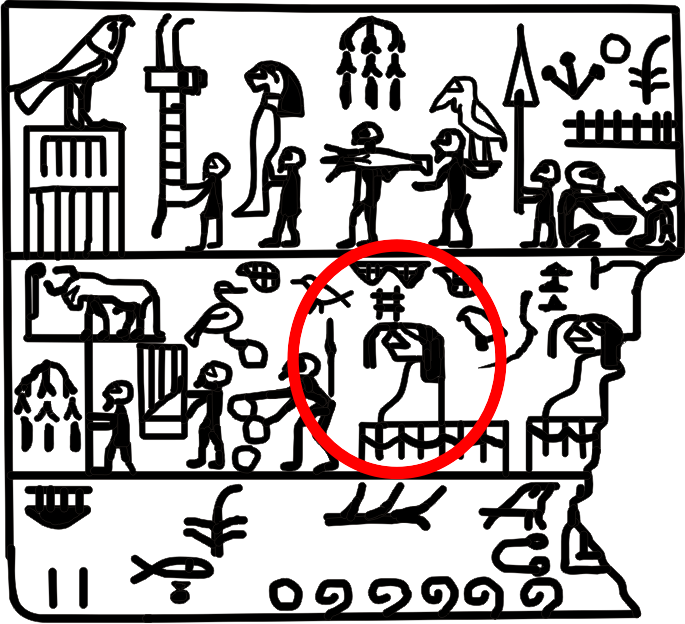
- Penebui depicted on a year tablet with blood streaming from her head

Queen consort of Egypt
- Tenure: c. 3020 BC
- Died: c. 3020 BC

Penebui in hieroglyphs
p nb nb
Pe-nebui (personal name)
P.nb.wj
Seat of the Two Lords
G36 t S42
Weret-hetes (royal title)
Wr.t hts
Great of Hetes-Scepters

Penebui (died c. 3020 BC) was an early Egyptian queen and most possibly the wife of king Djer during the 1st Dynasty. Her name was found engraved on several ivory tags.

== Identity ==
There are at least three ivory tags showing queen Penebui. Two were found in the necropolis of king Djer at Abydos, one (pretty damaged) at Saqqara in an anonymous tomb. The tags, called year tablets, show depictions of several ceremonies, such as a human sacrifice and the presentation of several cultic objects. The center of the engraving shows two figures of deceased queens. They are shown in shape of busts with female heads and hairstyles, resting on palatial decorated pedestals. There are fountains of blood coming out of their foreheads, symbolising the death of the women. In earlier times these blood fountains were falsely interpreted as flower ornaments or snake diadems. Both ladies names are introduced by a rare hieroglyph similar to the later sign for "excrement", the signs on the labels simply mean "to die" or "death". The former, first depicted lady can be identified as queen Penebui, this name means "seat of the two lords". Her name is also guided by the title Weret-hetes, meaning "great one of the Hetes sceptre", identifying her as a royal spouse. The other lady on the tags must have also been a queen, but of lower rank. Her title was Ma'a-heru, meaning "she who sees Horus". Unfortunately, her name is very difficult to read, it might be written with three fish symbols.

Penebui's death seems to be recorded on the famous Palermo stone in the 4th year event window of king Djer. Wolfgang Helck suspects that queen Penebui died violently due to decapitation, since the sign of a deceased royal lady in the year window is guided by the hieroglyph of a decapitated lapwing.
