= Herneith =

Queen consort of Egypt
- Tenure: c. 3050 BC
- Died: c. 3050 BC
- Burial: Possibly Tomb 3507 in Saqqara
- Spouse: Pharaoh Djer
- Issue: Djet?
- Dynasty: 1st dynasty of Egypt
- Religion: Ancient Egyptian religion

D2 R25
Herneith
in hieroglyphs
Era: Early Dynastic Period
(3150–2686 BC)

Herneith (fl. c. 3050 BC) was a Queen consort of ancient Egypt. She lived during the 1st Dynasty. The name herneith means "The face of Neith".

== Documents ==
In the tomb of Herneith in Saqqara her name is found scratched on a vase, while in Abydos the name is found written together with the name of Djer. However, the interpretation of their names written together remains controversial and it is not even certain that Herneith refers to a woman, and thus to a queen.

== Biography ==
It is not known who Herneith's parents were. She is thought to be a queen of Djer but there is no conclusive evidence. Tyldesley suggests Herneith as a possible mother of Den, but it is more commonly thought that Merneith was his mother.

Grajetzki mentions that even though Herneith is known from her tomb in Saqqara and her name is found together with signs that may refer to her role as a queen, confidently interpreting this information has proven difficult. If the interpretations are correct, Herneith may have held the titles of "The First One" and "Consort of the Two Lords".

A large tomb in Saqqara (tomb S3507) is thought to belong to Herneith. Inscriptions on vases found in the tomb mention King Djer, King Den and King Qa'a. The tomb is a mudbrick mastaba. However, a pyramid-like mound was found within the structure, covered with brick. This combination of mastaba and grave mound represents a combination of Northern (mastaba) and Southern (grave mound) tomb architecture.

== Literature ==
- Walter B. Emery: Great Tombs of the First Dynasty III. London 1958, S. 73–97.
