= Nakhtneith =

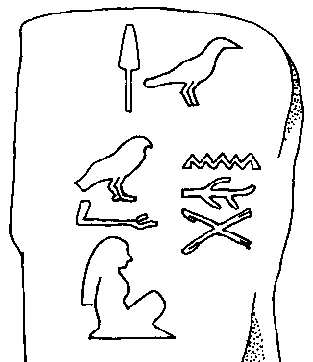
- Stela with name of Nakhtneith

Queen consort of Egypt
- Tenure: c. 3050 BC
- Died: c. 3050 BC
- Burial: Umm El Qa'ab, Sohag, Egypt
- Spouse: Pharaoh Djer
- Issue: Merneith? Djet?
- Dynasty: 1st Dynasty of Egypt
- Religion: Ancient Egyptian religion

n M3 R24
Nakhtneith
in hieroglyphs
Era: Early Dynastic Period
(3150–2686 BC)

Nakhtneith (fl. c. 3050 BC) was a queen consort of ancient Egypt. She lived during the 1st Dynasty. Her name means "strong is (the goddess) Neith".

== Biography ==
Nakhtneith (Nḫt Nj.t) was the wife of Pharaoh Djer. She is known from a stela found in Abydos (stela 95) where she was buried near her husband. On the stela she holds the titles "Great one of the hetes scepter" (Wr.t-ḥts) and "she who carries Horus" (Rmn- Ḥr.(w)). The stela is currently in the Cairo Museum (JE 35005). It measures 31.6 cm (12.4 in) high by 18.5 cm (7.3 in) wide.
