= Merneith =

Ancient Egyptian regent and consort

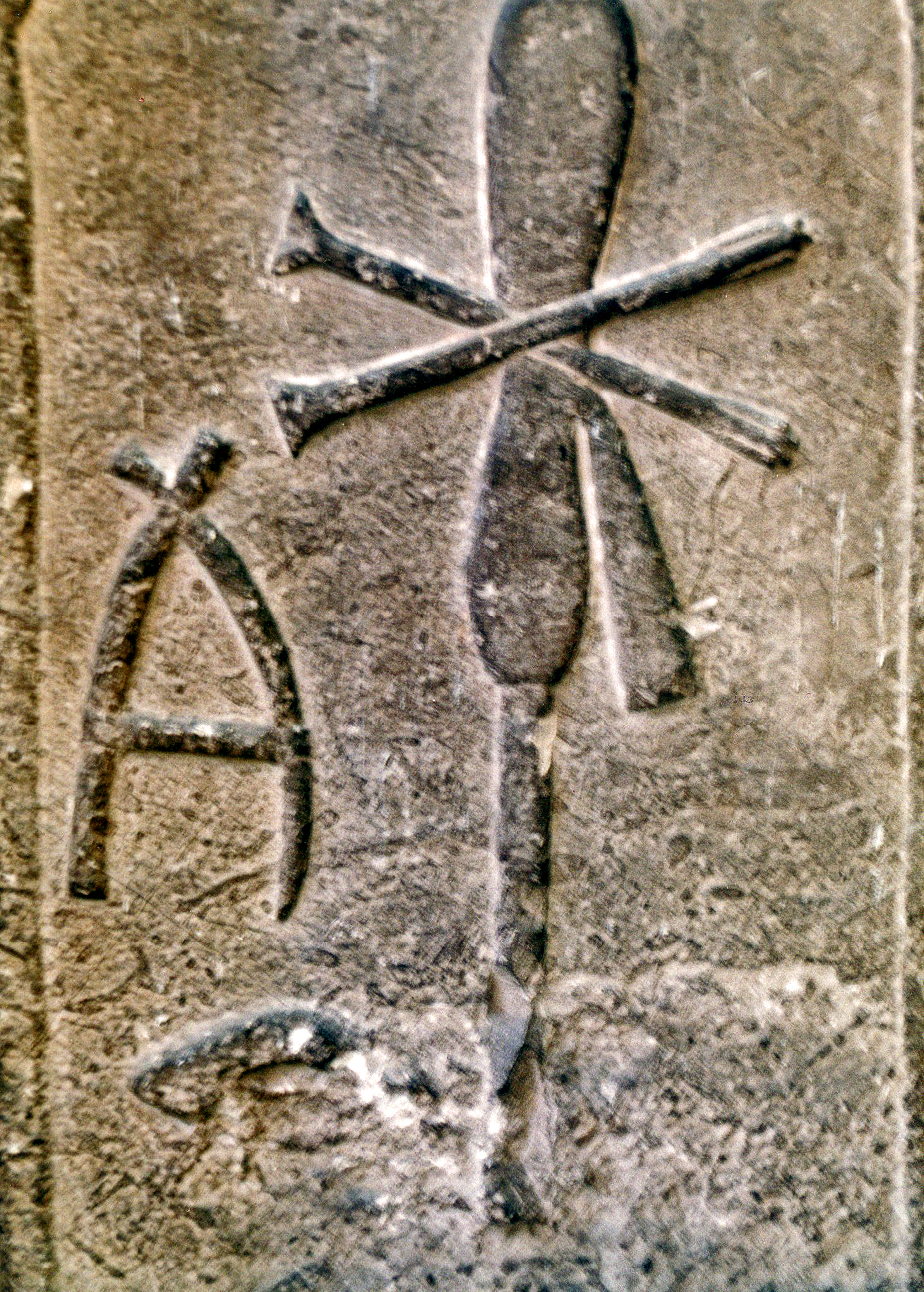
- Tomb stela of Merneith from the Umm el-Qa'ab

Regent of Egypt
- Regency: c. 2965 BC
- Predecessor: Djet
- Successor: Den
- Died: c. 2950 BC
- Burial: Tomb Y, Umm El Qa'ab, Sohag, Egypt
- Spouse: Djet
- Issue: Den
- Dynasty: 1st Dynasty
- Father: Djer

Merneith (also written Merit-neith and Meryt-Neith; died c. 2950 BC) was a consort and a regent of Ancient Egypt during the First Dynasty.

She may have been a ruler of Egypt in her own right, based on several official records. If this was the case and the earlier royal wife Neithhotep never ruled as an independent regent, Merneith may have been the known first female pharaoh and the earliest known queen regnant in recorded history. Her rule occurred around 2950 BC for an undetermined period. Merneith's name means "Beloved by Neith" and her stele contains symbols of that ancient Egyptian deity. She may have been Djer's daughter and was probably Djet's senior royal wife. The former meant that she would have been the great-granddaughter of unified Egypt's first pharaoh, Narmer. She was also the mother of Den, her successor.

== Family ==
𓌺𓋎
Merneith
in hieroglyphs
Era: Early Dynastic Period
(3150–2686 BC)

Merneith is linked with the kings Djer, Djet, and Den in a variety of seal impressions and inscribed bowls. Merneith may have been the daughter of Djer, but there is no conclusive evidence. As the mother of Den, it is likely that Merneith was the wife of Djet. No information about the identity of her mother has been found.

A clay seal found in the tomb of her son, Den, was engraved with "King's Mother, Merneith". Merneith was the daughter of Djer, and was Djet's wife.

From Abydos comes a small ivory fragment with the remains of two figures. It is possible that they show Merneith together with her son king Den.

== Biography ==
Merneith is believed to have become ruler upon the death of Djet. The title she held, however, is debated. It is possible that her son Den was too young to rule when Djet died, so she may have ruled as regent until Den was old enough to be the king in his own right. Before her, Neithhotep is believed to have ruled in the same way after her husband King Narmer died, as Narmer's son was too young to rule. Her name was written on a Naqada seal inside a serekh, which was the way the kings' names were written. This would mean Merneith may have actually been the second female in Egypt's first dynasty to have ruled as pharaoh.

The strongest evidence that Merneith was a ruler of Egypt is her tomb. This tomb in Abydos (Tomb Y) is unique among the otherwise exclusively male tombs. Merneith was buried close to Djet and Den. Her tomb is of the same scale as the tombs of the kings of that period. Two grave stelae bearing her name were discovered near her tomb. Merneith's name is not included in the king lists from the New Kingdom. A seal containing a list of pharaohs of the first dynasty was found in the tomb of Qa'a, the third known pharaoh after Den, her son. However, this list does not mention the reign of Merneith.

A few other pieces of evidence exist elsewhere about Merneith:

- Merneith's name appears on a seal found in the tomb of her son, Den. The seal includes Merneith on a list of the first dynasty kings. Merneith's name was the only name of a woman included on the list. All of the names on the list are the Horus names of the kings. However, Merneith's name is accompanied by the title "King's Mother".
- Merneith's name may have been included on the Palermo Stone.
- Items from the great mastaba (Nr 3503, 16 x 42 m) in Saqqara, where her name has been found in inscriptions on stone vessels, jars, as well as seal impressions. In particular, there is one seal from Saqqara, which shows Merneith's name in a serekh.
- The so-called Merneith Enclosure is a group of tombs from the cemetery at Shunet el-Zebib. These tombs are dated to the time of Merneith.
- Merneith's name was found on objects in king Djer's tomb in Umm el-Qa'ab.

== Tombs ==
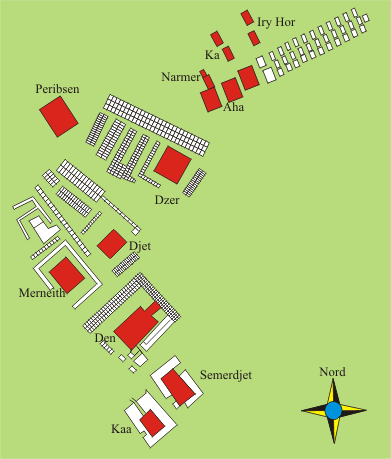
Cemetery B, Umm el-Qa'ab. Tombs of the pharaohs of the first and second dynasty of Egypt.

Plan of the main chamber of Merneith's tomb.

=== Abydos ===
At Abydos, the tomb belonging to Merneith was found in an area associated with other pharaohs of the first dynasty, Umm el-Qa'ab. Two stelae made of stone, identifying the tomb as hers, were found at the site.

In 1900, Flinders Petrie discovered Merneith's tomb and, because of its nature, believed it belonged to a previously unknown pharaoh. The tomb was excavated and was shown to contain a large underground chamber, lined with mud bricks, which was surrounded by rows of small satellite burials, with at least 40 subsidiary graves for servants.

The servants were thought to assist the ruler in the afterlife. The burial of servants with a ruler was a consistent practice in the tombs of the early first dynasty pharaohs. Large numbers of sacrificial assets were buried in her tomb complex as well, which is another honor afforded to pharaohs that provided the ruler with powerful animals for eternal life. This first dynasty burial complex was very important in the Egyptian religious tradition and its importance grew as the culture endured.

Inside her tomb archaeologists discovered a funerary boat that would allow her to travel with the sun deity in the afterlife.

Abydos was the site of many ancient temples, including Umm el-Qa'ab, the royal necropolis, where early pharaohs were entombed. These tombs began to be seen as extremely significant burials and in later times it became desirable to be buried in the area, leading to the growth of the town's importance as a cult site.

=== Saqqara ===
At Saqqara, Merneith's tomb exhibits features that possibly preview the builders of the Third Dynasty. Concealed within the normal rectangular palace façade mastaba of Merneith's tomb at Saqqara is the base of a stepped structure, a juxtaposition of two different methods of building. It is perhaps indicative of the fusion of northern and southern styles that was to lead, ultimately, to the Step Pyramid of Djoser, or influenced the design of the Third Dynasty structure.
