= Ha (mythology) =

Ancient Egyptian deity

Name in hieroglyphs
H A N25 R12
- Parents: Iaaw

Ha (Ancient Egyptian: ḥꜣ), in ancient Egyptian religion, was a god of the Western Desert and the fertile oasis of Western Desert of Egypt. He was associated with the Duat (the underworld) and pictured as a man wearing the hieroglyph symbol for desert hills on his head.

Ha was said to protect Egypt from enemies such as invading ancient Libyans. He is associated with Set, since Set represented the west of the Nile and they both have similar attributes - the desert.

== Worship ==
It is unknown when Ha was worshipped in ancient Egypt. But at first he was the god of fertility, son of an almost unknown deity named Iaaw, but in the later period of Egypt, he took his place by removing the western desert god Ash. He was later shown as the symbol of the west, while Sopdu was the symbol of the east, and Dedun the symbol of the south. The ancient Egyptians saw him as a guardian deity of the pharaoh. The inscription on the pyramids of Unas shows him as the protector of the dead pharaoh.

== Other Associations ==
The dinosaur Hagryphus ("Ha's griffin") was named after Ha; it was discovered in Utah and Ha's association with the western deserts was carried over to the deserts of the Southwestern United States.
