= First Dynasty of Egypt family tree =

Family tree of the First Dynasty of Egypt, ruling ancient Egypt in the 32nd century BCE to the 30th century BCE.

== Chart ==
Narmer/ Menes(?)
Aha
Djer
Djet
Den
Adjib
Semerkhet
Qa'a

Neithhotep
Khenthap
Nakhtneith
Merneith
Seshemetka
Betrest
