= Mastaba S3504 =

Tomb in Egypt

Coordinates: 29.8802°N 31.2216°E

Mastaba S3504 (Saqqara Tomb No. 3504) is a large mastaba tomb located in the Saqqara necropolis in Lower Egypt. It was built during the reign of the ancient Egyptian Pharaoh Djet, in the First Dynasty (Early Dynastic Period), shortly after 3000 BC. It is one of the largest mastabas from this dynasty. The building was excavated in 1953 by Walter Bryan Emery.

== Structure ==
The building is made of dried mudbricks and is 56.45 metres long and 25.45 metres wide. The original height is unknown. The mastaba was decorated on the outside with a palace facade (also called a niche facade). On the long sides there were eleven niches, but on the short sides, only four. The facade was painted white, the innermost niches red. The mastaba was enclosed by a wall and stood on a low platform, on which models of cattle heads with real cattle horns were found. Around the tomb there were up to 65 subsidiary tombs.

The actual mastaba superstructure contained 43 chambers. Below this was the burial chamber, which was surrounded by additional store rooms. The burial chamber itself was originally clad in gilt wood.

== Grave goods ==
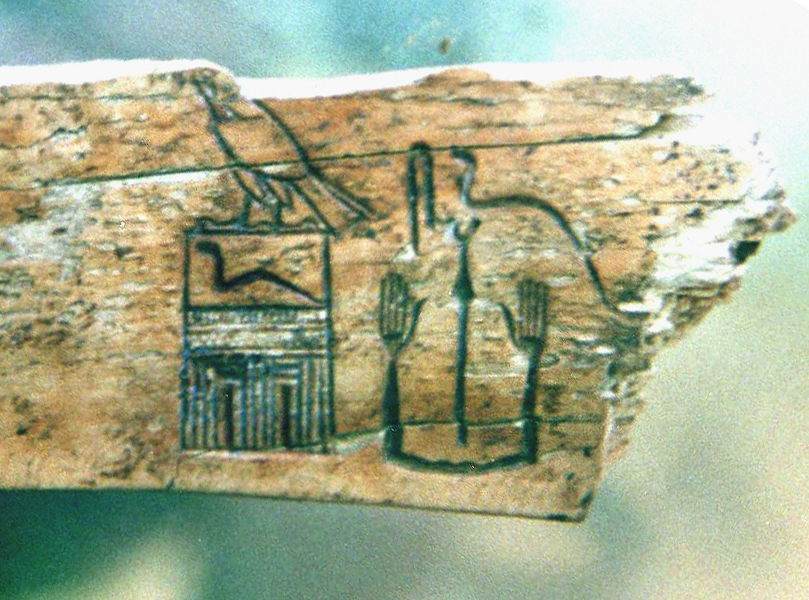
Finding with the serekh of pharaoh Djet and the name of the official Sekhemkasedj, from S3504

Although the tomb was robbed in antiquity, several items were found. In particular, in the storage chambers, the remains of c. 2500 pottery vessels were preserved. Valuable offerings were originally housed in the underground chambers. There are many remains of furniture, which include elaborate wooden carvings, copper and stone tools, and c. 1500 stone vessels. Many of the vessels were originally sealed with clay stoppers. The sealings are an important historical source. Several of them name the King Djet, but some also bear the name of the last king of the First Dynasty, Qa'a, under whom the grave was refurnished after being robbed for the first time.

== Occupant ==
The identification of the tomb owner was long debated in scholarship. The excavator Emery considered it the tomb of Djet, while more recent research suggests the official Sekhemkasedj as the tomb owner, since his name appears in several inscriptions found here. Another possibility is the tomb belonged to Sewedj-ka, the Seal Bearer of the King of Lower Egypt.

== Bibliography ==
- Walter B. Emery: The Great Tombs of the First Dynasty II. (= Egypt Exploration Society. / Memoir of the Egypt Exploration Society.) Egypt Exploration Society, London 1954, S. 5-127.
