= Ancient Egyptian retainer sacrifices =

Killing of servants on their master's death

Ancient Egyptian retainer sacrifice is a type of human sacrifice in which pharaohs and occasionally other high court nobility would have servants killed after the pharaohs' deaths to continue to serve them in the afterlife. In Egypt, retainer sacrifice only existed during the First Dynasty, from about 3100 BC to 2900 BC, dwindling in scale, and eventually dying out quickly.

== Historical context ==
=== Egypt's beliefs about the afterlife ===
Ancient Egyptians, like many cultures, believed in an afterlife, and much of what remains of their civilization reflects this because only the temples, tombs, and other religious structures survive well. One belief that was at the center of Egyptian beliefs about life after death was the belief in the ka. The ka was believed by the Egyptians to be one's life source, essence, and soul, which would live on in the afterlife. Egyptians also believed that the ka had to have a body to return to, and because of this belief, they would mummify their dead. Egyptians also took precautionary measures, in case their body did not survive, by commissioning ka statues; statues of the deceased that were buried in the tomb, along with the body, and would serve as a replacement if the body decayed beyond recognition. It was especially important to ensure the comfort of the king's ka in the afterlife, due to his prominent position both in politics and religion.

Egyptians looked at the afterlife as a continuation of this life and believed that they would be able to enjoy many of the same activities. They also held the belief that they would be able to maintain the same social hierarchy. Egyptians, especially upper-class Egyptians, were very preoccupied with making sure their life to come would be as comfortable, if not more comfortable, than their life on earth. Excavated tombs were found to contain food, painted murals, statues, jewelry, and various other items.

=== Power of the Pharaoh ===
Egyptian pharaohs were revered as gods in human form. Ellen F. Morris, a professor in Columbia University's Department of Anthropology, suggests that pharaohs used retainer sacrifices as a way to flaunt their power. She also argues that pharaohs would have to have significant power, in both a political and religious sense, to convince their subjects that it was worth sacrificing their lives on earth for the pharaoh and his comfort in the next life. In addition, their families would have to be convinced that the pharaoh's comfort in the life to come was important enough to allow their loved ones to be sacrificed. This would not be possible if those being sacrificed did not have a very strong belief in the life to come. Egypt's government had to convince the people that the king was a god, and what belonged to him in his life on earth, belonged to him in the afterlife also. Dr. David O'Connor, from New York University Institute of Fine Arts, proposes that subjects of a king being willing to escort him into the afterlife demonstrates that a change had occurred in the way the Egyptians viewed their king.

== Evidence for retainer sacrifices ==
As is common with most Egyptian archeology, the plundering and destructive excavation of tombs, both in the past and the present, for tomb riches, has hindered the ability to gain as much knowledge about retainer sacrifices as would be available if the tombs were intact. Dr. O'Connor does believe that retainer sacrifices were the exception, instead of the norm, in ancient Egypt.

There is some disputation as to the authenticity of retainer sacrifices, due to less than substantial evidence; however, most Egyptologists believe that retainer sacrifice did happen. Normally, ancient Egyptians in shared gravesites were buried at different times. To the contrary, in those graves believed to contain retainer sacrifices, the individuals were buried simultaneously, suggesting these retainers were sacrificed. The archaeologists claim that since the grave roofing is continuous, the burials had to have been made at the same time.

In 2026, Roselyn Campbell of Purdue University re-examined 46 skulls from the 1st Dynasty excavated by Flinders Petrie. She discovered around 18 of them showed signs of cranial trauma and may have been caused by retainer sacrificial practices. Campbell notes that the practice died out very quickly, and is not seen by the 2nd Dynasty with people being replaced by statuettes.

== Reasons for retainer sacrifices ==
=== Pharaohs' and nobles' perspective ===
The purpose of retainer sacrifices was "to enable the wealthy nobles [and pharaohs] to enjoy the same kind of life-style after death as [they] had during [their] lifetime". They also wanted to maintain the same social status they had enjoyed on earth; a social hierarchy that was based upon being served by others. Pharaohs used retainer sacrifices to reinforce the power of the position of the pharaoh, by showing the control they had over their subjects. Pharaohs also used retainer sacrifices to help communicate the idea that the state was literally worth dying for.

=== Retainers' perspective ===
Pharaohs' subjects viewed the pharaoh as a living god, the god Horus. Once the pharaoh died, he became the god Osiris, the king of eternity. While some retainers' deaths appear to have been taken for granted, other sacrifices appear to have raised the status and wealth of some retainers in the afterlife. This can be inferred from the wealth they were interred with and their graves' position in relation to the king's grave. This also suggests that the retainers agreed to be sacrificed to raise their social status and wealth in the afterlife. Matthew Adams, an archeologist from the University of Pennsylvania and the associate director of an expedition made by New York University, Yale and the University of Pennsylvania, suggests that the ancient Egyptians may have viewed being sacrificed at a king's death a sure way to reach eternal life. For a civilization so centered on the life to come, a guarantee of eternal happiness and security would seem a likely motivation for a retainer to agree to be sacrificed.

== First dynasty retainer sacrifices in general ==
Graves around royal tombs often contained harem members, minor palace function members, court dwarfs, and even dogs, as denoted by the stelae buried in the tombs. However, there was a variety in the demographics of those retainers that were sacrificed. During the First Dynasty, pharaohs were not the only individuals that had retainer sacrifices carried out. Servants of both royalty and high court officials were slain to accompany their master in the next world. The number of retainers buried surrounding the king's tomb was much greater than those of high court officials, however, again suggesting the greater importance of the pharaoh.

== Specific kings' retainer sacrifices from the first dynasty ==
=== King Aha ===
King Aha, the second pharaoh of the first dynasty of Egypt, was also known as King Hor-Aha. According to Ellen Morris, he had thirty-five retainer sacrifices in his tomb, and twelve in three surrounding tombs enclosed in his funerary enclosure. Two other accounts from popular sources are given regarding the number of sacrificed retainers found in King Aha's funerary enclosure. One account found in The New York Times, was given by an archeological team organized by New York University, Yale, and the University of Pennsylvania. These universities began a project to excavate the funerary complex of King Aha. They found six graves near a mortuary ritual site of King Aha. Five of the six graves contained "skeletons of court officials, servants, and artisans that appear to have been sacrificed to meet the king's needs in the afterlife. Another account is given by National Geographic, in an article entitled "Abydos: Life and Death at the Dawn of Egyptian Civilization." In this account, six retainer sacrifices were buried inside of Aha's tomb with him, and thirty-five were buried in surrounding tombs inside his funerary complex.

=== King Djer ===
King Djer, Aha's son and successor, had 318 retainer sacrifices buried in his tomb, and 269 retainer sacrifices buried in enclosures surrounding his tomb. Dr. O'Connor believes that the more than 200 graves found in King Djer's funerary complex contain retainer sacrifices, as well. According to Ancient Egypt: A Social History, King Djer was buried with over 580 retainers. It is highly unlikely that all these retainers died of natural causes at the same time, suggesting that these retainers were sacrificed upon the death of King Djer. According to the National Geographic article, 569 retainers were sacrificed for King Djer.

=== King Djet ===
King Djet had 174 sacrificed retainers buried around his tomb at Abydos and sixty-two retainers buried around his tomb at Saqqara.

=== King Den ===
After the death of King Den, about 230 individuals died simultaneously for "something or someone of extreme importance". Once again, it is highly unlikely that such a large number of individuals would die all at once of natural causes and it can be inferred that these individuals were sacrificed to serve King Den in the afterlife. Perhaps this reflected the varied court positions in the pharaoh's kingdom, possibly including family members, noble court members, and servants.

=== King Qaa ===
The funerary complex of King Qaa helps illustrate the decline of retainer sacrifices. It is estimated that only thirty retainers were sacrificed after the death of King Qaa.

== Demographics of sacrificed retainers ==
S.O.Y. Keita and A.J. Boyce, authors of Variation in Porotic Hyperostosis in the Royal Cemetery Complex at Abydos, Upper Egypt: A Social Interpretation, examined forty-four skulls from the funerary complex of King Djer and discovered that those buried outside the tomb enjoyed better health than those in the actual tomb. This can be interpreted in two ways. First, those buried outside the tomb were believed to have enjoyed better health because they were wealthier, and consequently, had better nutritional standards. The second is that those buried inside the royal tomb could afford to take care of their illness-ridden children. Whichever explanation is correct, there is such a statistically significant difference that these two groups most likely did not share the same social status.

Of the twelve sacrificed and buried in the three surrounding tombs of King Aha's funerary complex, all identifiable retainers "were all male and around twenty years of age". Morris suggests that these retainers, due to their gender, youth, and how they were buried, "regimented alignment in straight rows", were possibly a military guard, buried with the king to protect and serve him in the afterlife. Dr. Laurel Bestock, one of the archeologists on the New York University, Yale, and University of Pennsylvania team, recalled that the people buried in King Aha's complex were not only lowly servants, but included rich nobles as well.

Most of the retainer sacrifices in the surrounding tombs of the funerary complex of King Djer at Abydos were female and probably consisted of "the king's subsidiary wives, concubines, relatives, or maidservants. The retainers sacrificed during King Den's reign were "not a homogenous group, but ... included a number of individuals of varying duties and status".

== Possible methods of sacrifice ==
Nancy Lovell, a physical anthropologist, believes that the retainers were strangled to death, due to the pinkish stain on their teeth. "When someone is strangled, increased blood pressure can cause blood cells inside their teeth to rupture and stain the dentin, the part of the tooth just under the enamel". Matthew Adams proposed another method of sacrifice. He stated that since no trauma was found on the skeletons, poisoning was probably the cause of death.

== Reasons for dwindling of retainer sacrifices ==
Retainer sacrifice was abandoned almost immediately after the end of the First Dynasty. One theory posits that retainers of the pharaohs after the First Dynasty were not convinced of the immediate need to die in order to serve a leader in the next life, and instead believed that they could serve the pharaoh after they died, when their time came.

Another probable reason for the decline, and eventual end, of retainer sacrifices is the creation of shabti-figures. Shabti-figures were mummy-shaped figurines, meant to replace retainer sacrifices; "... the responsibility for carrying out tasks on behalf of the deceased was transferred to a special kind of funerary statuette, known as a shabti-figure". These shabti-figures were believed to carry out a wide variety of tasks, including everything from cultivating fields, to irrigating canals, to serving the deceased. Engraved on the shabti-figures was a "magical" text that was meant to ensure they would carry out their assigned tasks.

== See also ==
- Funeral of a Norse chieftain (especially Human sacrifice subsection)
- Wooden tomb model

== Sources ==
- Galvin, John. "Abydos: Life and Death at the Dawn of Egyptian Civilization." National Geographic Apr. 2005: 106–21. Print.
- Garstang, John. Burial Customs of Ancient Egypt. 1st. Great Britain: Kegan Paul Limited, 2002. 16–17. Print.
- Grinsell, Leslie V. Barrow, Pyramid and Tomb: Ancient burial customs in Egypt, the Mediterranean and the British Isles. 1st. Great Britain: Thames and Hudson Ltd, 1975. 39. Print.
- Morris, Ellen F. "Sacrifice for the State: First Dynasty Royal Funerals and the Rites at Macramallah's Rectangle." 15–37. Print.
- Skinner, Andrew. "Ancient Egyptian Obsession With Eternity." Brigham Young University. Harold B. Lee Library. 22 Oct. 2009.
- Spencer, A.J. Death In Ancient Egypt. 1st. Great Britain: Penguin Books Ltd, 1982. 68;139. Print.
- Stokstad, Marilyn. Art History: Ancient Art. 3rd. 1. Upper Saddle River, New Jersey: Pearson Education, 2009. 52–55. Print.
- Trigger, B.G., B.J. Kemp, D. O'Connor, and A.B. Lloyd. Ancient Egypt: A Social History. 1st. Great Britain: University Press, Cambridge, 1983. 52–56. Print.
- Wilford, John Noble. "With Escorts to the Afterlife, Pharaohs Proved Their Power." New York Times 16 Mar. 2004, Late: F3. Print.
