= Sekhemkasedj =

Official of the First Dynasty of Egypt

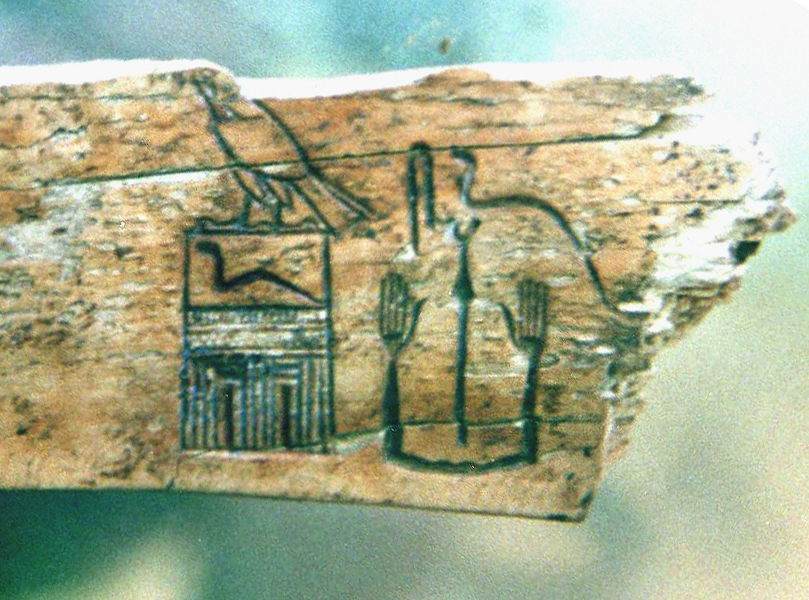
- Serekh of the king Djet with the name of Sekhemkasedj, mastaba S3504
Egyptian name
Sḫm-kȝ-s-ḏS29 I10 S42 D28
- Dynasty: First Dynasty
- Pharaoh: Djet, Merneith
- Burial: S3504

Sekhemkasedj was a high-ranking Egyptian official who lived during the reign of King Djet and the regency of Merneith—at the beginning of Den's reign—during the First Dynasty. He is attested by several documents (seals, labels) discovered in his tomb (S3504) at Saqqara, as well as in King Djet's tomb at Abydos.

== Biography ==
Based on the seals naming Sekhemkasedj, he held titles within the administrative sphere:

- During the reign of Djet:
  - "Nekhenu" (nḫn(w)) and "Nekheb" (nḫb)—titles perhaps linked to the city of El Kab, known as Nekheb in Ancient Egyptian,
  - "Administrator" (adj-mer, ˁḏ-mr) of the funerary estate of Djet, named Wadj-Hor (Wȝȝ-Ḥr); this was his principal title, which he held throughout the reign of Djet,
- During the reign of Merneith:
  - "Overseer" (khérep, ḫrp) of the Da'Ouadji funerary estate, and no longer "administrator,"
  - "Kherep Nekhenu" (ḫrp nḫn(w))—and no longer simply "Nekhenu"—as well as the obscure title "kherep nebi" (ḫrp nbj),
  - "Administrator" (adj-mer, ˁḏ-mr) of the royal estate of Hor-sekhenti-dju (Ḥr-sḫntj-ḏw)—a title he obtained at the end of his career and which appears to mark its pinnacle, as the Hor-sekhenti-dju estate seems to have been the most important royal foundation of the first half of the First Dynasty.

Sekhemkasedj was also linked to a royal foundation named Hout-Henen (Ḥw.t ḥnn).

== Tomb ==
Sekhemkasedj is buried in mastaba S3504 at North Saqqara, where a large part of the country's elite was interred during the First Dynasty. This tomb was excavated in 1953 by Walter Bryan Emery. He initially believed it to be the tomb of King Djet, as his serekh is attested on several artifacts discovered within the tomb. Furthermore, the resumption of excavations at the Umm el-Qa'ab necropolis in Abydos in the 1980s confirmed that the king's tomb was indeed located in that cemetery.

== Bibliography ==
- Wilkinson, Toby Alexander Howard (1999). Early dynastic Egypt. Londres, New-York: Routledge. p. 436. ISBN 978-0415186339. ;
- Emery, Walter Bryan (1954). The Great Tombs of the First Dynasty. Vol. 2. Londres: Egypt Exploration Society..
