= Benerib =

Queen Consort of First Dynasty Egypt

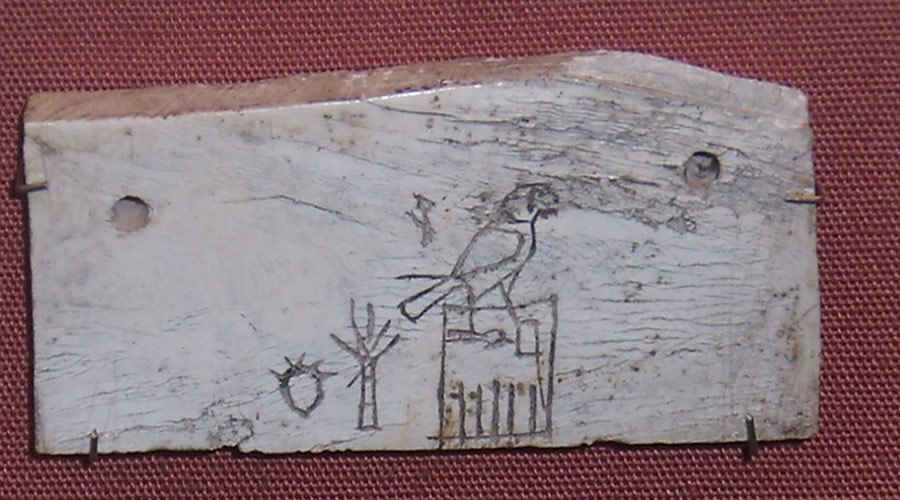
- Names of Benerib and Hor-Aha, British Museum

Queen consort of Egypt
- Tenure: c. 3050 BC
- Died: c. 3050 BC
- Burial: B14, Umm el-Qa'ab
- Spouse: Pharaoh Hor-Aha
- Dynasty: 1st Dynasty of Egypt
- Religion: Ancient Egyptian Religion

Benerib (fl. c. 3050 BC) was a queen consort of ancient Egypt from First Dynasty. Benerib's name means "sweet of heart".

== Biography ==
ib M32
Benerib
in hieroglyphs
Era: Early Dynastic Period
(3150–2686 BC)

Benerib was a wife of pharaoh Hor-Aha, but she was not the mother of his heir, Djer. The mother of king Djer is named as Khenthap, another wife of Hor-Aha. Benerib is thought to be the wife of Hor-Aha based on ivories found in her tomb at Abydos which show his name. A fragment of an ivory box with the names of Hor-Aha and Benerib was also found at Abydos and is now in the Boston Museum of Fine Arts.

Egyptologist John Romer argued that Benerib's name, which can be translated to "sweetheart" or "one who is pleasant at heart", may not even be a name at all but rather a title or epithet for a person whose sex is also not confirmed by the name.

Benerib's titles are not known, and neither is the identity of her parents.

Benerib was buried at Umm el-Qa'ab in tomb B14.
