= Amka (official) =

Ancient Egyptian senior official

Amka was the name of an ancient Egyptian senior official who served the Pharaohs Djer, Djet and Den during the First Dynasty of Egypt. He is the first early Egyptian official whose career can be traced almost continuously.

== Biography ==
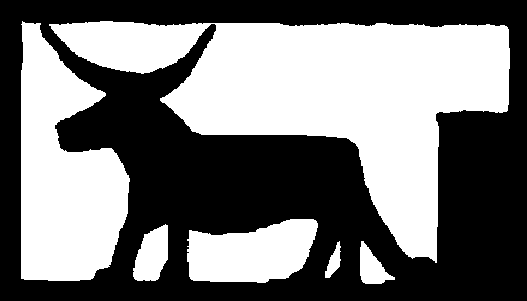
Hieroglyph for hut-ihut. Hut means house.

Amka served during three reigns in the First Dynasty; his name appears on seal impressions from the tombs of the pharaohs Djer, Djet and Den and of Queen Merneith in the royal cemetery at Abydos. His career began in the last years of the reign of King Djer, continued through the reign of Djet and ended in the first years of the reign of King Den, when Merneith was regent. Under Djer he was already involved in the administration of the domain of "Hor-sekhenti-dju (Horus surpasses the mountains)" and had the titles "nebi" and "heri-nehenu".

He retained the latter title under Djet. Under Merneith and Den, he appears to have reached the height of his career, achieving the rank of mortuary priest (sekhenu-akh). His last position was as district administrator (adj-mer) of the House of the Calf (hut-ihut), a district in the western Nile Delta, probably near Kom el-Hisn. He appears to have moved from the administration of royal foundations to regional administration.
