= Hor-Aha =

Egyptian pharaoh (First Dynasty)

- Aha
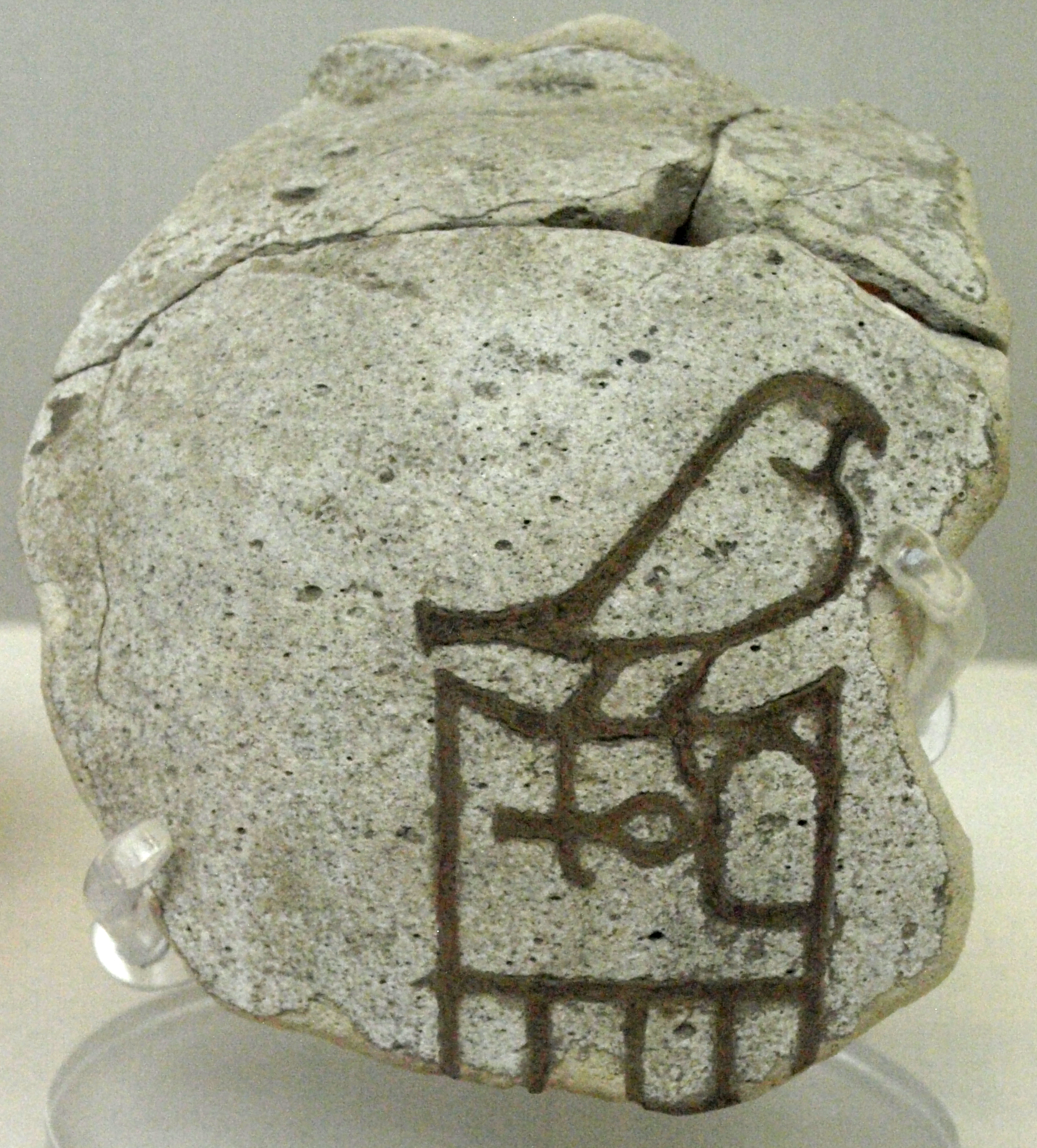
- Faience vessel fragment with serekh inscribed with the Horus-name "Aha", on display at the British Museum.

Pharaoh
- Reign: circa 35 years beginning c. 3050 BC
- Predecessor: Narmer
- Successor: Djer
Royal titulary
Horus name
Hor-Aha
Ḥrw-ꜥḥꜣ
Horus, the fighter
Alternative translation:
He who fights (the enemies) for Horus
G5	D34
Prenomen
Teti
ttj
Of true greatness
< t t i >
- Consorts: Benerib, Khenthap
- Children: Djer
- Father: Narmer ?
- Burial: Chambers B10, B15, B19, Umm el-Qa'ab
- Dynasty: 1st Dynasty

Hor-Aha (or Aha or Horus Aha; fl. c. 3085 BC) is considered the second pharaoh of the First Dynasty of Egypt by most Egyptologists, (Note: Most scholars, particularly in recent years have chosen the identification of Menes with Narmer and therefore accept Hor-Aha as the second king of the 1st dynasty. For example, some of these notable recent works include Kahl 2006: 94; Quirke 2010: 65; Tallet 2013: 122; 2015: 22, n. 70; Hendrickx 2014: 271; Heagy 2014, Cervelló Autuori 2021, Heagy 2021. Those who assert that Hor-Aha was the first i.e. Menes and not Narmer, include notably scholars such as Dreyer, Helck, Kaplony and for publications in recent years, von Beckerath (1999: 36-39) and Leprohon (2013: 22-25). These recent publications according to Autuori (2021), clearly force the sources. Also, it is clear from the Qa'a 'king list' seas that the contemporary Egyptians considered him the second king of the First Dynasty.) while others consider him the first one and corresponding to Menes. He lived around the 31st century BC and is thought to have had a long reign.

== Identity ==
=== Name ===
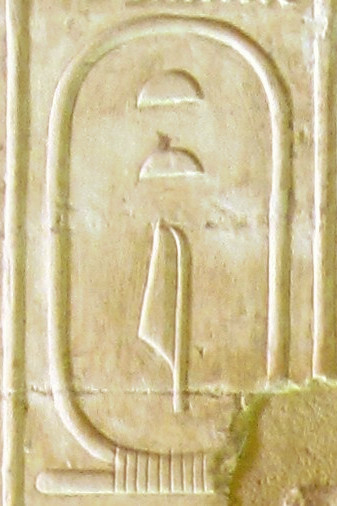
Teti, cartouche name of Hor-Aha in the Abydos King List.

The commonly used name Hor-Aha is a romanisation of his Horus name, written as a Horus falcon perched upon a serekh with a mace and shield in its talons, forming a variant of hieroglyph Gardiner code D34. Read as Aha (ꜥḥꜣ), the Egyptian verb 'to fight', here a masculine singular participle describing an attribute of the king (Horus) and thus translated as Horus 'the fighter' by scholars.

Manetho's record Aegyptiaca (translating to History of Egypt) lists his Greek name as Athothis, or "Athotís".

In the contemporary Early Dynastic sources, kings are most usually identified by their Horus and later (after Den) their Nebty/Nesut biti names. Whereas, the later Ramesside kinglists tend to use their Personal/Nebty names, rather than their Horus names. Thus there are issues with matching Horus name to Personal/Nebty names on the Abydos and Turin canon. However, in more recent years it has been increasingly accepted that we do in fact have the personal names of the earliest kings Narmer = Menes, Djer = Iti, Djet = Ita, based on the existence of particular sealings and graffito. Although, Hor-Aha, is left as the outlier with no seal and or document like the Djer Sinai graffito discovered by Tallet that confirms his Horus name. It has however, been argued by Autuori that a contemporary seal of Hor-Aha (IÄF III, fig. 36), with an additional two X1 brad loaf/'t' glyphs placed within his serekh, may actually be a writing of his personal name. As tt is very close to ttj (Teti) the spelling on the Abydos and Turin canon.

Regardless, based on the sequence of 1st dynasty kings in contemporary sources it is generally accepted by those that agree Menes = Narmer. That Hor-Aha is indeed the Teti mentioned as the second king of the first dynasty on the Abydos and Turin canon.

=== Theories ===
There has been some controversy about Hor-Aha. Some believe him to be the same individual as the legendary Menes and that he was the one to unify all of Egypt. Others claim he was the son of Narmer, the pharaoh who unified Egypt. Narmer and Menes may have been one pharaoh, referred to with more than one name. Regardless, considerable historical evidence from the period points to Narmer as the pharaoh who first unified Egypt (see Narmer Palette) and to Hor-Aha as his successor.

== Reign ==
=== Successor to Narmer ===
Seal impressions discovered by Günter Dreyer in the Umm El Qa'ab from Den and Qa'a burials identify Hor-Aha as the second pharaoh of the first dynasty. His predecessor Narmer had united Upper Egypt and Lower Egypt into a single kingdom, Upper and Lower Egypt. Hor-Aha probably ascended the throne in the mid 31st century BC.

=== Interior policy ===
Hor-Aha appears to have commemorated visits to a number of religious sites, for ritual activities. One year label of Aha (Aha3) from Abydos appears to record both a visit to a shrine of Neith (likely at Sais). It has been suggested this was to honour the lower Egyptian origins of Neithhotep if she was indeed his mother. Furthermore, the same label in the second register appears to commemorate a visit to the Djebaut (ḏbꜥ.wt) shrine in Buto. A third visit to a religious site may be recorded on the right hand side of the first register of the Naqada label. Which has a combination of signs, that although often argued to be evidence in the Narmer-Menes debate, may simply be read instead as a visit or founding of a nb.tj (nebty, two ladies) shrine. It is now the general consensus that the Naqada label has no bearing on the Narmer-Menes debate. Moreover, many scholars doubt that it is a nebty name as the nebty name simply is not in use this early on.

Furthermore, the first register of the Naqada label may show an iꜥb nṯr.w or iꜥb sḫm.w barque of Sokar (rather than a Henu or Maaty barque), or alternatively it may depict a following of Horus event which is more administrative in nature. The other above mentioned label Aha3 which commemorates the visit to the Djebaut shrine at Buto, also shows other ritual activity taking place there, possibly even a running of the Apis bull along with other connected rituals. Moreover, the second register of the Naqada label depicts potentially some kind of ritual feast. One other label of Aha (Aha2) also appears to depict a ritual event in which human sacrifice takes place. Furthermore, the labels of Aha's reign attest to the fashioning of 2 or 3 Imiut (im.i-wt) fetishes. Label Aha5, however, depicts the sign Gardiner code E15, and so may instead be read as Anubis instead of an Imiut fetish, and thus interpreted as the fashioning of a statue of Anubis. A making of a statue of Anubis is also recorded on the surviving year entries on the Palermo stone dated to the last year of the reign of Hor-Aha.

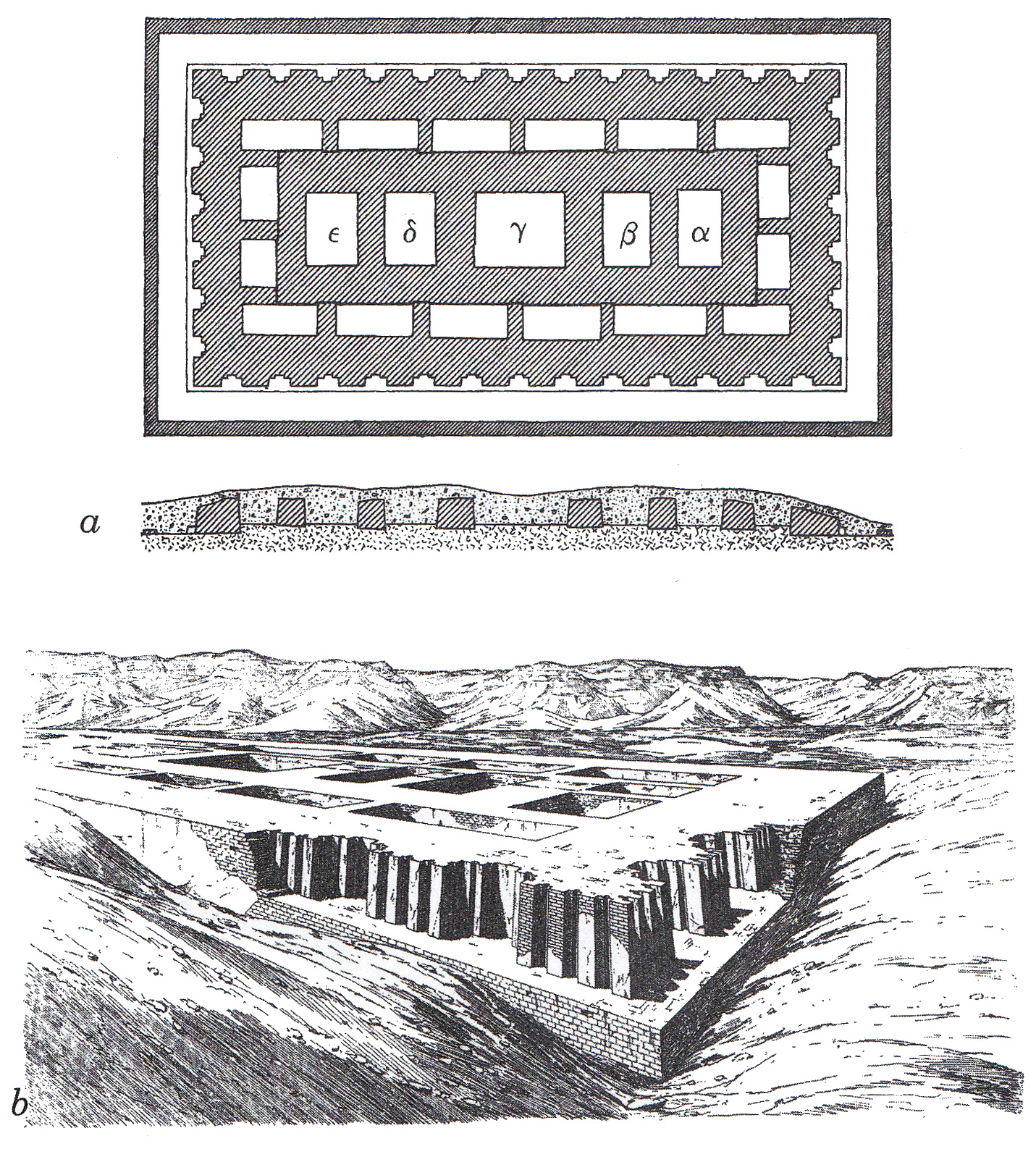
Mastaba attributed to Neithhotep which is believed to have been built by Hor-Aha.

The magnificent Naqada Mastaba at a size of 54m by 27m, Excavated by De Morgan, dates to the reign of Hor-Aha. It is a monumental 'palace facade' mastaba tomb, with 16 chambers and 5 larger and deeper inner chambers, of which the middle is the burial chamber. De Morgan states that the outer 16 chambers are for burial goods, but according to Kahl et al they are purely architectural features formed by the supporting walls as a structural element of the superstructure. The structure had a low bench around the outer walls, and a mud brick enclosure wall. The names Narmer, Aha, Rekhit and Neithhotep have been found here. The burial assemblage of this tomb is exceedingly high status for this period, with ivory vessels inscribed with Rekhit, and Neithhotep in the Burial chamber, along with ivory fragments associated with a coffin like object. Furthermore, ivory and copper objects, as well as stone palettes, expensive beads, and stone vessels have been found in other chambers. As for the occupant of this tomb, there are two main candidates, Rekhit and Neithhotep, now considering the exceedingly high status of this burial and scale of the tomb, Neithhotep is often considered by scholars to be most likely, and so usually identified as the occupant. However, some consider Rekhit, a possible, brother/half brother or son of Aha to be the tombs occupant due to him being the most attested individual within the tomb. It is also now known, however, that Neithhotep out lived Aha, and is attested alongside Djer, Aha's successor on a graffito at Wadi Ameyra in the Sinai.

The oldest Mastaba at Saqqara is tomb S3357 which dates to the reign of Hor-Aha, and is of the 'palace facade' type, excavated by Emery. It is approximately 42m by 16m, and notably has a boat grave. It is generally considered to have had one the highest officials of Aha as its occupant, likely a member of the royal family. Which makes the possible princes of Aha, Het, Sa-Iset and Rekhit mentioned on seals and burial goods of the tomb potential candidates for the occupant of the tomb. Most importantly though, is it marks the appearance of the first tomb in Saqqara, the Memphite necropolis under Aha, coinciding with his larger concentration of attestations in the region compared to predecessors, for example, at Helwan and Zawyet el-Aryan. Showing an intensification of Royal interest in Memphis under Aha, which indeed would make sense given Manetho's remark that Aha built a palace in Memphis, it is likely according to Heagy that Aha moved the residence from Thinis to Memphis.

=== Economic development ===
Few artifacts remain of Hor-Aha's reign. However, the finely executed copper-axe heads, faience vessel fragments, ivory box and inscribed white marbles all testify to the flourishing of craftsmanship during Aha's time in power. Furthermore, Hor-Aha's tomb complex at Umm el-Qa'ab, is far larger than his predecessors. This has even been used by some as an argument for the identification of Aha with Menes. However, it in general testifies to a growing capacity for the contemporary administration to command significantly larger quantities of labour than ever before.

=== Activities outside Egypt ===
Inscription on an ivory tablet from Abydos suggests that Hor-Aha led an expedition against the Nubians. On a year tablet, a year is explicitly called 'Year of smiting of Ta-Sety' (i.e. Nubia).

During Hor-Aha's reign, trade with the Southern Levant seems to have been on the decline. Some scholars consider Hor-Aha to be unattested in the Southern Levant. However, many would identify a serekh on a vessel fragment from En Besor as his, and so it is quite possible Hor-Aha is indeed attested in the Southern Levant. Although, clearly a major drop in attestations in the Southern Levant when compared to Narmer, who is attested securely many times at multiple sites. Either way the Egyptian outpost in En Besor is known to have been active in the reign of Hor-Aha, and Hor-Aha's tomb also contained fragments of pottery from Syro-Palestine. Furthermore, the Naqada label mentioned above may also attest to this. If Helck's interpretation of the boat scene in the Neith shrine visit labels third register is followed, and timber is indeed being transported. Then it may imply that the toponyms mentioned could be as far out as Lebanon, the usual source for Egypt's timber. To corroborate this, analysis of the timber in Hor-Aha's tomb has shown it is cedar wood which was procured by Egyptians exclusively from Lebanon. Thus the earliest known Egyptian contact with Lebanon (likely Byblos), is securely dated to Hor-Aha's reign.

=== Year-by-year records ===
The Palermo stone lists the final year and death of Hor-Aha's reign, as well as the heights of the Nile for each.

- last year: Following of Horus, creating an image of Anubis. (damaged)
- year of death: 6 months and 7 days.

=== Manetho ===
According to the Egyptian priest Manetho (who lived over 2,600 years after Hor-Aha's reign), Aha built a palace in Memphis and was a skilled physician who wrote multiple books on anatomy.

== Family ==
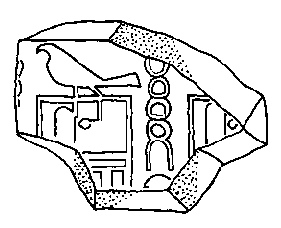
Clay seal fragment bearing Hor-Aha's serekh together with ḥ and t signs, perhaps meant to signify a personal name Htj

One possible family member of Aha, is the occupant of tomb B14 within his funerary complex, named Imaib (imꜣ-ib) or "Benerib" (bnr-ib), which is best translated as "Beneficent of heart, or Sweet of heart". Usually taken by scholars to be a chief wife of Aha or an important official. Based on the translation of this individuals name they have typically been identified as a female family member of Aha, however, Bestock (2009) points out that the use of the name element ib "heart", is not exclusive to women in the Early Dynastic period. Furthermore, Bestock pointed out that from Aha's funerary complex, all the occupants of the subsidiary graves (of which B14 is one), have been male. Which does indeed cast doubt on the identification of this individual as the chief wife of Aha. Three reasons were posited by Bestock for this discrepancy, firstly that, "Beneribs remains were among those recovered and the name was misinterpreted as female when Benerib is male.", "The remains weren't collected, but Benerib is male.", or "That the remains of benerib were not found but Benerib is female, thus being exceptional for her sex and status when compared to the other occupants of the subsidiary graves." Either way, based on their tomb size (chamber B14), and finds recovered, whatever Imaib/Beneribs sex, they were an important official under Aha and likely a relative of the king. Hence also Wilkinsons identification of them with a chief queen of Aha.

The Palermo stone, records the mother of Djer as Khenthap, who must then also be a Queen of Aha.

Rekhit has often been identified as a prince of Narmer, and thus a brother or half-brother to Hor-aha. However, he has also been identified as a prince of Hor-Aha, based on his name being juxtaposed next to Aha's name on some seal impressions in a type of seal known as the "prinzen seal".

Other individuals whose names have been found on seals of Aha, and whom maybe identified as Princes or Princesses, include het (ḥ.t) and Sat-iset (zꜣ.t-is.t).

Neithhotep, was most likely the mother of Hor-Aha and Queen of Narmer. Although, may also have been a wife of Aha instead, given that she lived until the reign of Djer.

== Tomb ==
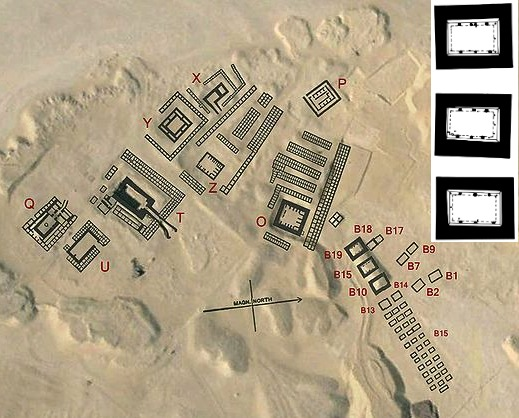
Hor-Aha's tomb comprises three chambers B10, B15 and B19, shown in inset. B14 could be the tomb of Hor-Aha's wife Benerib.

The tomb of Hor-Aha is located in the necropolis of the kings of the 1st Dynasty at Abydos, known as the Umm el-Qa'ab. It comprises three large chambers (designated B10, B15, and B19), which are directly adjacent to Narmer's tomb. The chambers are rectangular, directly dug in the desert floor, their walls lined with mud bricks. The tombs of Narmer and Ka had only two adjacent chambers, while the tomb of Hor-Aha comprises three substantially larger yet separated chambers. The reason for this architecture is that it was difficult at that time to build large ceilings above the chambers, as timber for these structures often had to be imported from Canaan.

A striking innovation of Hor-Aha's tomb is that members of the royal household were buried with the pharaoh, the earliest known retainer sacrifices in Egypt. It is unclear if they were killed or committed suicide. Among those buried were servants, dwarfs, women and even dogs. A total of 36 subsidiary burials were laid out in three parallel rows north-east of Hor-Aha's main chambers. As a symbol of royalty Hor-Aha was even given a group of young lions.

== Gallery ==
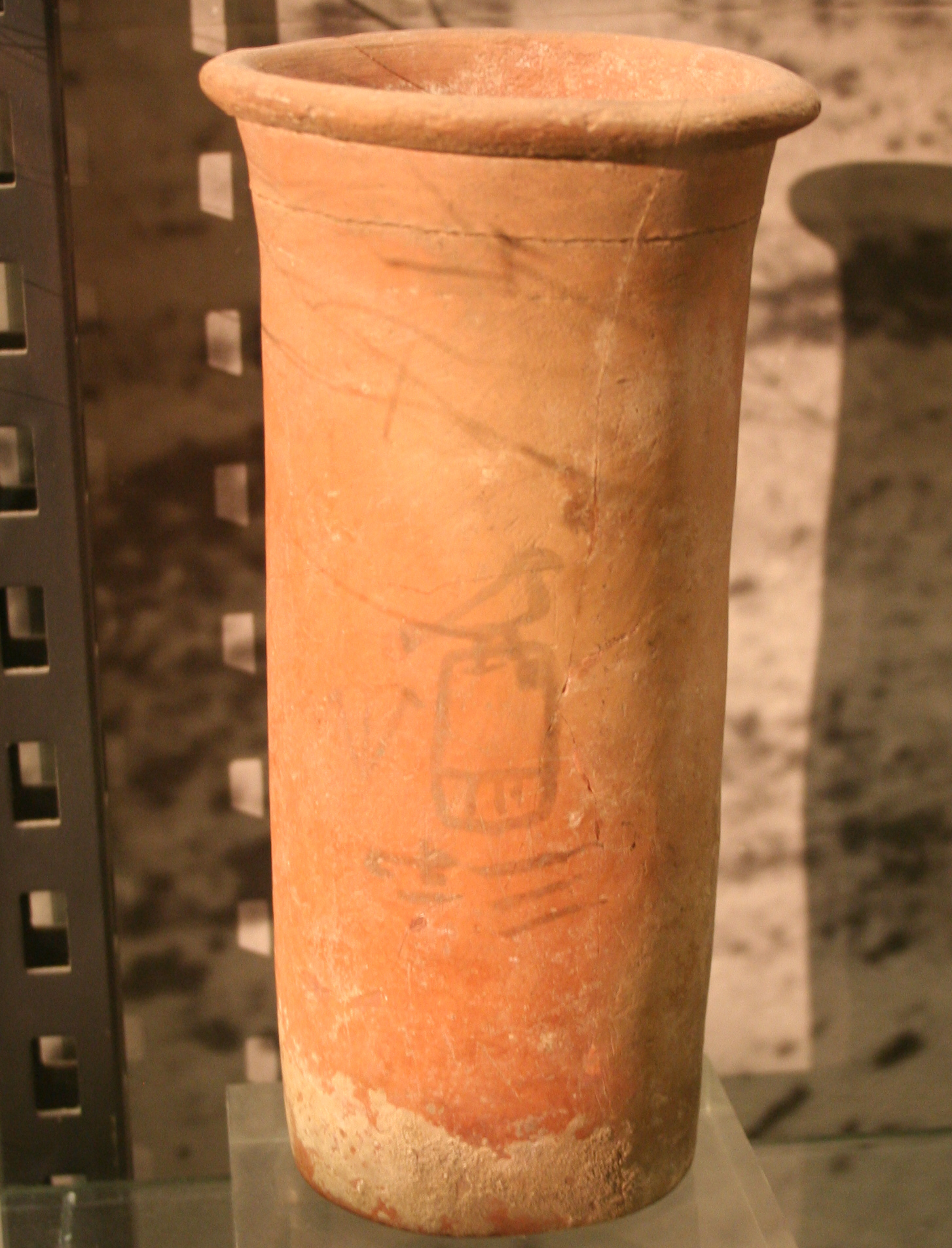
Cylinder vessel of Hor-Aha from Saqqara, First Dynasty; Museum August Kestner.

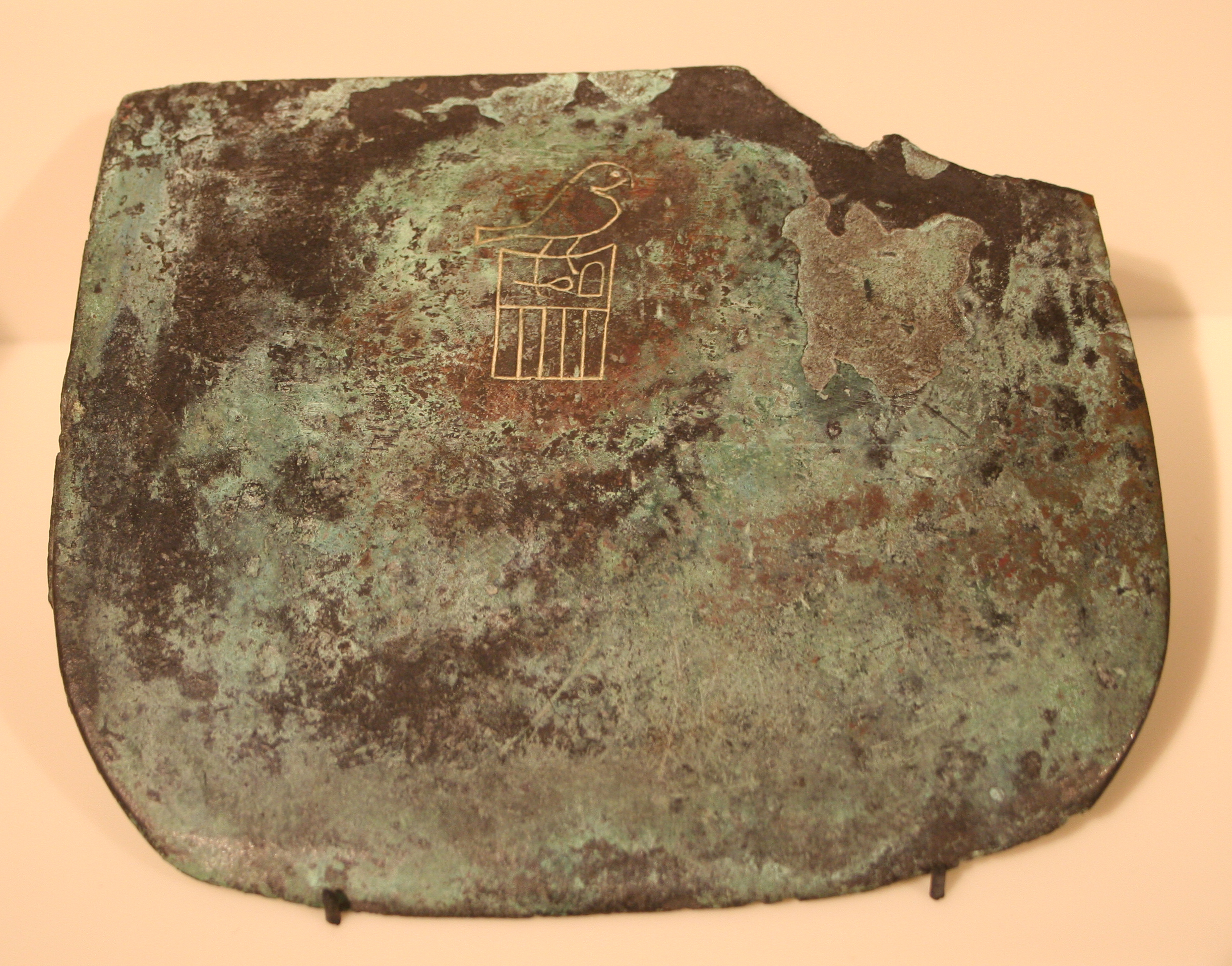
Copper tool bearing the serekh of Hor-Aha, on display at the Egyptian Museum of Berlin.

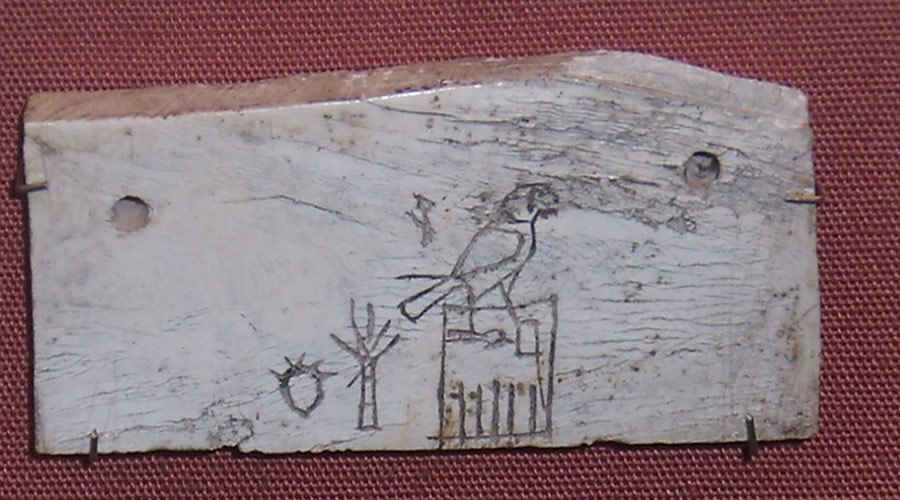
Ivory label inscribed with the serekh of Hor-Aha and bearing the name of his wife Benerib.

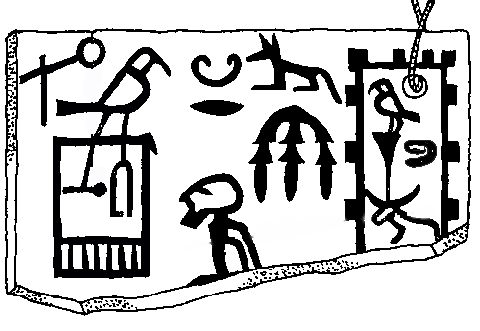
Ivory label bearing the serekh of Hor-Aha. It reports the victory over the "arch-using Setjet-folks" (center) and the visit at the domain "Horus thrives with the cattles" (right).

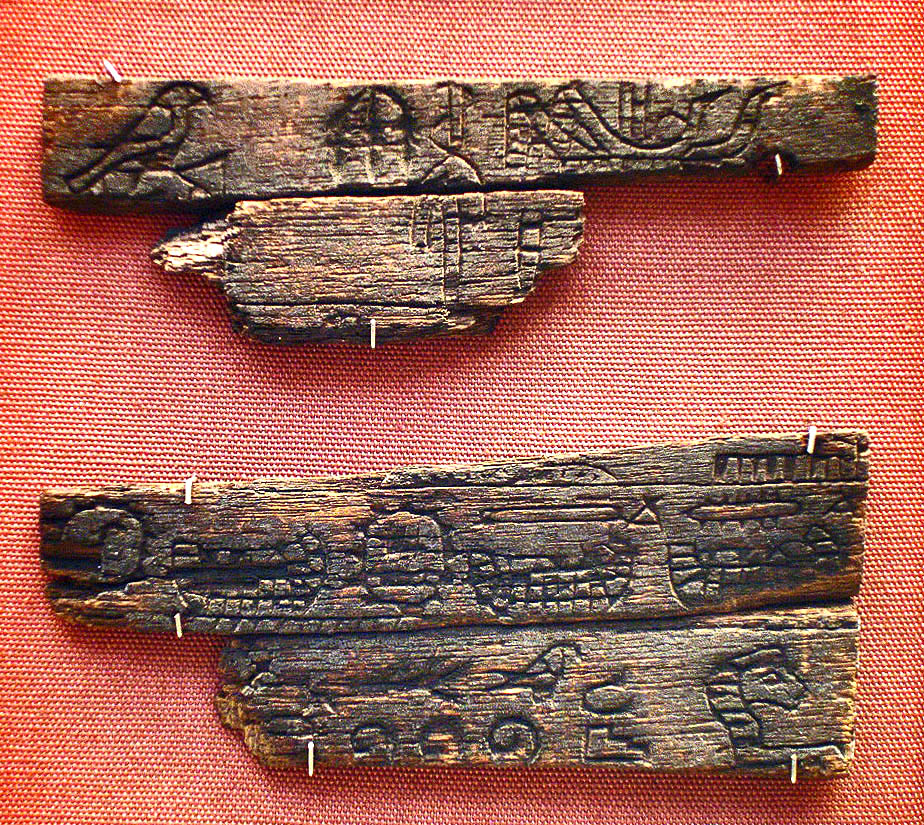
Fragmented ebony label of Hor-Aha relating a visit of the king to the shrine of the goddess Neith of Sais in the Delta, British Museum.

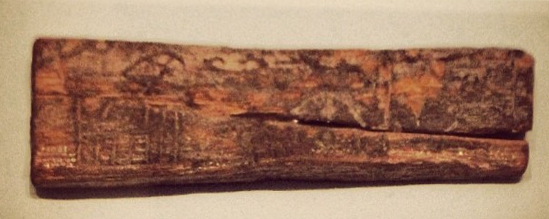
Label of King Aha, Abydos

== In popular culture ==
- Episode 1 of season 4 of Franklin & Bash, "The Curse of Hor-Aha" revolves around a rare Egyptian artifact and the protagonists trying to find it to get their boss back.
- Murder by the Gods: An Ancient Egyptian Mystery by William G. Collins is a thriller about Prince Aha (later king Hor-Aha), with Narmer as a supporting character.

== See also ==
- Ancient Egypt
- Ancient Egyptian retainer sacrifices
- History of Egypt
- List of Pharaohs
- Pharaoh
- The Greatest Pharaohs

== Bibliography ==
- Bestock, L. (2009). The development of royal funerary cult at Abydos: two funerary enclosures from the reign of Aha. Menes. Otto Harrassowitz. ISBN 978-3-447-05838-4.
- Bestock, L. (22 October 2020). "Early Dynastic Egypt". In Radner, K.; Moeller, N.; Potts, D. T. (eds.). The Oxford History of the Ancient Near East (1st ed.). Oxford University PressNew York. pp. 245–315. doi:10.1093/oso/9780190687854.003.0005. ISBN 978-0-19-068785-4.
- Cervelló, A. J. (2005). "Was King Narmer Menes?". Archéo-Nil. Revue de la société pour l'étude des cultures prépharaoniques de la vallée du Nil. 15 (1): 31–46. doi:10.3406/arnil.2005.896. ISSN 1161-0492.
- Cervelló Autuori, J. (2005). The Thinite «Royal Lists»: Typology and Meaning. Origines. Toulouse 2005. L'Égypte pré- et protodynastique. Les origines de l'état.
- Cervelló Autuori, J. (2021). Menes, Teti, Iti, Ita. An Update. Orientalia Lovaniensia Analecta. Peeters. ISBN 978-90-429-4140-3.
- Crubézy, E.; Midant-Reynes, B. (2000). "Les sacrifices humains à l'époque prédynastique: l'apport de la nécropole d'Adaïma". Archéo-Nil. Revue de la société pour l'étude des cultures prépharaoniques de la vallée du Nil. 10 (1): 21–40. doi:10.3406/arnil.2000.1229. ISSN 1161-0492.
- Dee, M.; Wengrow, D.; Shortland, A.; Stevenson, A.; Brock, F.; Girdland Flink, L.; Bronk Ramsey, C. (8 November 2013). "An absolute chronology for early Egypt using radiocarbon dating and Bayesian statistical modelling". Proceedings of the Royal Society A: Mathematical, Physical and Engineering Sciences. 469 (2159) 20130395. Bibcode:2013RSPSA.46930395D. doi:10.1098/rspa.2013.0395.
- Dreyer, G. (2007). Wer war Menes?. Supplément aux Annales du Service des Antiquités de l'Égypte, Cahier. ISBN 978-977-437-241-4.
- Dreyer, G.; Hartung, U.; Pumpenmeier, F. (1998). Umm el-Qaab. Archäologische Veröffentlichungen. P. von Zabern. ISBN 978-3-8053-2486-1.
- Edwards, I. E. S. (1971). Edwards, I. E. S.; Gadd, C. J.; Hammond, N. G. L. (eds.). The Cambridge Ancient History. Vol. 1 (3rd ed.). Cambridge University Press. pp. 1–70. doi:10.1017/CHOL9780521077910.002. ISBN 978-0-521-07791-0.
- Emery, W. B. (1939). Hor-Aha. Government Press, Cairo.
- Heagy, T. C. (2014). "Who was Menes?". Archéo-Nil. Revue de la société pour l'étude des cultures prépharaoniques de la vallée du Nil. 24 (1): 59–92. doi:10.3406/arnil.2014.1071. ISSN 1161-0492.
- Helck, W. (1953). "Gab es einen König "Menés"?". Zeitschrift der Deutschen Morgenländischen Gesellschaft. 103 (n.F. 28) (2). Harrassowitz Verlag: 354–359. ISSN 0341-0137.
- Helck, W. (1987). Untersuchungen zur Thinitenzeit. Ägyptologische Abhandlungen. O. Harrassowitz. ISBN 978-3-447-02677-2.
- Hendrickx, S. (2008). "Les grands mastabas de la Ire dynastie à Saqqara". Archéo-Nil. Revue de la société pour l'étude des cultures prépharaoniques de la vallée du Nil. 18 (1): 60–88. doi:10.3406/arnil.2008.957. ISSN 1161-0492.
- Gaballa, G. A.; Kitchen, K. A. (1969). "The Festival of Sokar". Orientalia. 38 (1). GBPress- Gregorian Biblical Press: 1–76. ISSN 0030-5367.
- Jiménez Serrano, A. (2002). Royal festivals in the late predynastic period and the first dynasty. British Archaeological Reports International series. Archaeopress. ISBN 978-1-84171-455-4.
- Kahl, J. (1994). Das System der ägyptischen Hieroglyphenschrift in der 0. - 3. Dynastie. Göttinger Orientforschungen Reihe 4, Ägypten. Harrassowitz. ISBN 978-3-447-03499-9.
- Kahl, J.; Engel, E. (2001). "Die Funde aus dem 'Menesgrab' in Naqada". MDAIK. 57: 171–186.
- Kahl, J.; Bretschneider, M.; Kneissler, B. (2002). Frühägyptisches Wörterbuch. Harrassowitz. ISBN 978-3-447-04594-0.
- Kaplony, P. (1963a). Die Inschriften der Ägyptischen Frühzeit. Vol. 1. Harrassowitz. ISBN 978-3-447-10765-5.
- Kaplony, P. (1963b). Die Inschriften der Ägyptischen Frühzeit. Vol. 3. Harrassowitz. ISBN 978-3-447-10767-9.
- Kinneaer, J. (2003). "The Naqada Label and the Identification of Menes". Göttinger Miszellen. 1976: 23–30.
- Logan, T. J. (1990). "The Origins of the Jmy-wt Fetish". Journal of the American Research Center in Egypt. 27: 61–69. doi:10.2307/40000074. ISSN 0065-9991. JSTOR 40000074.
- Menu, B. (2001). "Mise à mort cérémonielle et prélèvements royaux sous la 1ère dynastie (Nârmer-Den)". Archéo-Nil. Revue de la société pour l'étude des cultures prépharaoniques de la vallée du Nil. 11 (1): 163–175. doi:10.3406/arnil.2001.1242. ISSN 1161-0492.
- Mittmann, S.; מיטמן, ז. (1981). "טביעות חותם מצריות קדומות ותחריט "סרח" של המלך חר (הורוס) מן הנגב הצפוני / Frühägyptische Siegelinschriften Und Ein Srḫ-Emblem Des Horus-ʿḥ; Aus Dem Nördlichen Negeb". Eretz-Israel: Archaeological, Historical and Geographical Studies / ארץ-ישראל: מחקרים בידיעת הארץ ועתיקותיה. טו. Israel Exploration Society: 1*–9*. ISSN 0071-108X.
- Morgan, J. de (2001). "Recherches sur les origines de l'Égypte". Archéo-Nil. [object Object]. doi:10.11588/DIGLIT.7138.
- Petrie, W. M. F. (19 September 2013). The Royal Tombs of the First Dynasty (1st ed.). Cambridge University Press. doi:10.1017/CBO9781107337305. hdl:2027/mdp.39015040355573. ISBN 978-1-108-06613-6.
- Petrie, W. M. F. (31 October 2013). The Royal Tombs of the Earliest Dynasties (1st ed.). Cambridge University Press. doi:10.1017/CBO9781107337299. ISBN 978-1-108-06612-9.
- Regulski, I. (2010), A Palaeographic study of early writing in Egypt, Peeters
- Schott, S. (1950). Hieroglyphen Untersuchungen zum Ursprung der Schrift. Akademie der Wissenschaften und der Literatur in Mainz.
- Sowada, K. N. (2009). Egypt in the Eastern Mediterranean during the Old Kingdom: An Archaeological Perspective. Vol. 237. [object Object]. ISBN 978-3-7278-1649-9.
- Tallet, P.; Laisney, D. (2015). Les inscriptions pré- et protodynastiques du Ouadi ʿAmeyra: CCIS n° 273-335. La zone minière pharaonique du Sud-Sinaï. Institut français d'archéologie orientale diffusion AFPU. ISBN 978-2-7247-0672-7.
- Vandier, J. (1952). Manuel d'archéologie égyptienne. Vol. 1.2. Paris, Éditions A. et J. Picard.
- Van Wetering, J. (2012). "Prehistory of Northeastern Africa New Ideas and Discoveries". Relocating De Morgan's Royal Tomb at Naqada and Identifying Its Occupant. Studies in African Archaeology. Vol. 11. Poznan Archaeological Museum. pp. 91–124. ISBN 978-83-60109-27-4.
- Weill, R. (1961). Recherches sur la Ire dynastie et les temps prépharaoniques. Vol. 2. Institut français d'archéologie orientale du Caire.
- Wilkinson, T. (2000). Royal annals of ancient Egypt: the Palermo stone and its associated fragments. Studies in egyptology. Kegan P. international. ISBN 978-0-7103-0667-8.
- Wilkinson, T. A. H. (2001). Early dynastic Egypt. Routledge. ISBN 978-0-415-26011-4.
