= Ahaneith =

Ancient Egyptian royal lady

- Resting place: Umm el-Qa'ab
- Occupation: Queen of Egypt (?)
- Spouse: Djet (?)

Ahaneith was an ancient Egyptian woman, who lived during the First Dynasty of Egypt. She was named after the goddess Neith.

The First Dynasty pharaoh Djet was buried in tomb Z in Umm el-Qa'ab and there is a stele bearing Ahaneith's name in that tomb. The stele is named UC 14268 in the University College London catalogue for the Petrie Museum of Egyptian Archaeology. Whether Ahaneith was the wife of the king, a royal official or a relative of the king, is not known.
