= Menes =

Founder of Manetho's 1st dynasty and unifier of Egypt

- Africanus: Mênês; Eusebius: Mênês; Narmer (?); Hor-Aha (?)
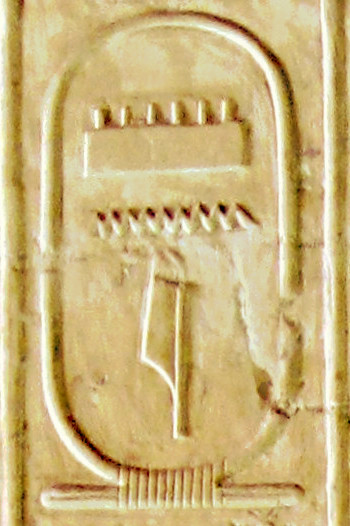
- The cartouche of Menes on the Abydos King List

Pharaoh
- Reign: c. 3200–3000 BC
- Predecessor: if Narmer: Scorpion II?; if Hor-Aha: Narmer
- Successor: if Narmer: Hor-Aha; if Hor-Aha: Djer
Royal titulary
Prenomen
Menes
Mnj
He who endures
< Y5 N35 M17 >Nisut-Bity-Men
nsw.t-bjtj-mn
King of Upper and Lower Egypt, the endurer
M23 t L2 t Y5
- Burial: Umm El Qa'ab chambers B17 and B18 (Narmer’s burial); Umm El Qa'ab chambers B10/B15/B19 (Hor-Aha’s burial)
- Dynasty: First Dynasty

Menes (fl. c. 3200–3000 BC; /ˈmiːniːz/; Ancient Egyptian: mnj, probably pronounced */maˈnij/; Ancient Greek: Μήνης and Μήν) was a pharaoh of the Early Dynastic Period of ancient Egypt, credited by classical tradition with having united Upper and Lower Egypt, and as the founder of the First Dynasty.

The identity of Menes is the subject of ongoing debate, although mainstream Egyptological consensus inconclusively identifies Menes with the Naqada III ruler Narmer or his successor, the First Dynasty pharaoh Hor-Aha.

== Name and identity ==
The name Menes is first documented in the work of Manetho, an Egyptian historian and priest of the relatively late Ptolemaic period. Manetho noted the name in Greek as Μήνης (transliterated: Mḗnés). An alternative Greek form, Μιν (transliterated: Min), was cited by the fifth-century-BC historian Herodotus, but this variant appears to be unrelated, the result of contamination from the name of the god Min. The Egyptian form, mnj, is taken from the Turin and Abydos King Lists, which are dated to the Nineteenth Dynasty, whose pronunciation has been reconstructed as */maˈnij/. By the early New Kingdom, changes in the Egyptian language meant his name was already pronounced */maˈneʔ/. The name mnj means "He who endures", which, I.E.S. Edwards (1971) suggests, may have been coined as "a mere descriptive epithet denoting a semi-legendary hero [...] whose name had been lost". Alternatively, the name may conceal the collective identity of the Naqada III rulers: Ka, Scorpion II and Narmer, or may simply refer to a functional leadership role.

=== Narmer, Hor-Aha, and Menes ===
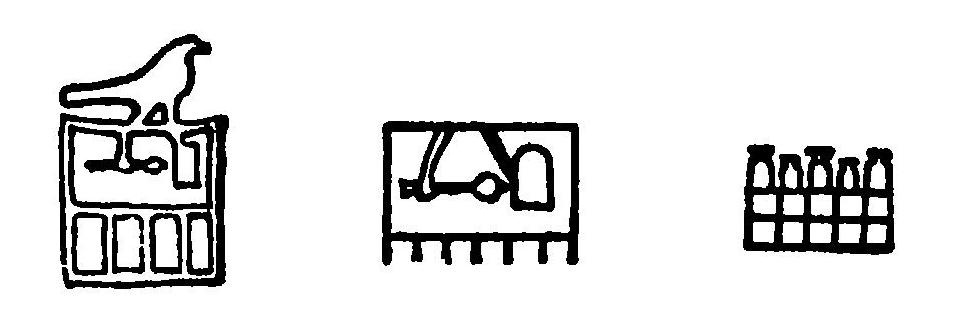
Two Horus names of Hor-Aha (left and center) and a name of Menes (right) in hieroglyphs.

Ivory tablet of Menes

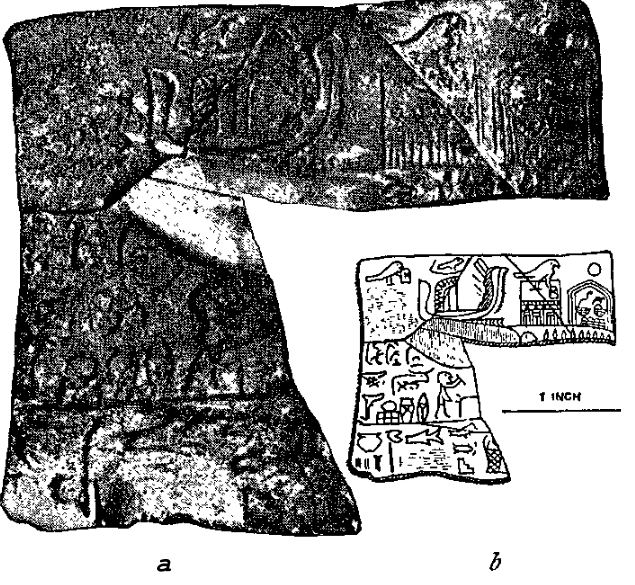
The ivory label mentioning Hor-Aha along with the mn sign.

Reconstructed tablet.

Reconstruction of the Narmer-Menes Seal impression from Abydos

The almost complete absence of any mention of Menes in the archaeological record and the comparative wealth of evidence of Narmer, a protodynastic figure credited by posterity and in the archaeological record with a firm claim to the unification of Upper and Lower Egypt, has given rise to a theory identifying Menes with Narmer.

The lead archaeological reference to Menes is an ivory label (from the town Naqada) which depicts the royal title Aha (the pharaoh Hor-Aha) next to a building, and within this is the royal title mn, generally taken to be Menes. (Note: Originally, the full royal title of a pharaoh was Horus name x nebty name y Golden-Horus name z nesu-bit name a Son-of-Ra name b. For brevity's sake, only one element might be used, but the choice varied between circumstances and period. Starting with Dynasty V, the nesu-bit name was the one regularly used in all official documents. In Dynasty I, the Horus-name was used for a living pharaoh, the nebty-name for the dead.) From this, various theories on the nature of the building (a funerary booth or a shrine), the meaning of the word mn (a name or the verb endures) and the relationship between Hor-Aha and Menes (as one person or as successive pharaohs) have arisen.

The Turin and Abydos king lists, generally accepted to be correct, list the nesu-bit-names of the pharaohs, not their Horus name, and are vital to the potential reconciliation of the various records: the nesu-bit-names of the king lists, the Horus-names of the archaeological record and the number of pharaohs in Dynasty I according to Manetho and other historical sources.

Flinders Petrie first attempted this task, associating Iti with Djer as the third pharaoh of Dynasty I, Teti (Turin) (or another Iti (Abydos)) with Hor-Aha as second pharaoh, and Menes (a nebty-name) with Narmer (a Horus-name) as first pharaoh of Dynasty I. Lloyd (1994) finds this succession "extremely probable", and Cervelló-Autuori (2003) categorically states that "Menes is Narmer and the First Dynasty begins with him". However, Seidlmayer (2004) states that it is "a fairly safe inference" that Menes was Hor-Aha.

Two documents have been put forward as proof either Narmer or Hor-Aha was Menes. The first is the "Naqada Label" found at the site of Naqada, in the tomb of Queen Neithhotep, often assumed to have been the mother of Horus Aha. The label shows a serekh of Hor-Aha next to an enclosure inside of which are symbols that have been interpreted by some scholars as the name "Menes". The second is the seal impression from Abydos that alternates between a serekh of Narmer and the chessboard symbol, "mn", which is interpreted as an abbreviation of Menes. Inconclusive arguments have been made with regard to each of these documents in favour of Narmer or Hor-Aha being Menes. (Note: In the upper right hand quarter of the Naqada label is a serekh of Hor-Aha. To its right is a hill-shaped triple enclosure with the "mn" sign surmounted by the signs of the "two ladies", the goddesses of Upper Egypt (Nekhbet) and Lower Egypt (Wadjet). In later contexts, the presence of the "two ladies" would indicate a "nbty" name (one of the five names of the king). Hence, the inscription was interpreted as showing that the "nbty" name of Hor-Aha was "Mn" short for Menes. An alternative theory is that the enclosure was a funeral shrine and it represents Hor-Aha burying his predecessor, Menes. Hence Menes was Narmer. Although the label generated a lot of debate, it is now generally agreed that the inscription in the shrine is not a king’s name, but is the name of the shrine "The Two Ladies Endure," and provide no evidence for who Menes was.)

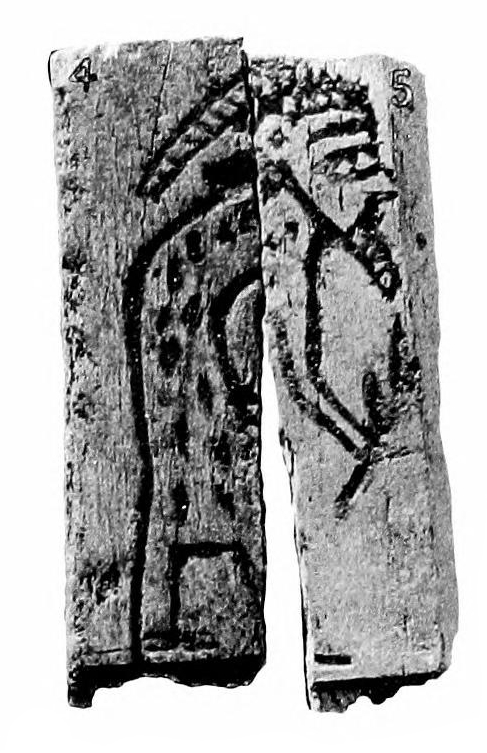
Vassal subject with headdress and spotted robe, possibly a Libyan, paying homage. First Dynasty, 2960–2770, Tomb of Narmer B17, Abydos.

The second document, the seal impression from Abydos, shows the serekh of Narmer alternating with the gameboard sign (mn), together with its phonetic complement, the n sign, which is always shown when the full name of Menes is written, again representing the name "Menes". At first glance, this would seem to be strong evidence that Narmer was Menes. However, based on an analysis of other early First Dynasty seal impressions, which contain the name of one or more princes, the seal impression has been interpreted by other scholars as showing the name of a prince of Narmer named Menes, hence Menes was Narmer's successor, Hor-Aha, and thus Hor-Aha was Menes. This was refuted by Cervelló-Autuori 2005, pp. 42–45; but opinions still vary, and the seal impression cannot be said to definitively support either theory.

Herodotus, having mentioned Min as the first king of Egypt, wrote that Linus, or Egyptian Maneros, was "the only son of the first king of Egypt" and that he died untimely.

== Dates ==
Egyptologists, archaeologists, and scholars from the 19th century have proposed different dates for the era of Menes, or the date of the first dynasty: (Note: Other dates typical of the era are found cited in Capart, Jean. Primitive Art in Egypt. pp. 17–18.)

- John Gardner Wilkinson (1835) – 2320 BC
- Jean-François Champollion (Published posthumously in 1840) – 5867 BC
- August Böckh (1845) – 5702 BC
- Christian Charles Josias Bunsen (1848) – 3623 BC
- Reginald Stuart Poole (1851) – 2717 BC
- Karl Richard Lepsius (1856) – 3892 BC
- Heinrich Karl Brugsch (1859) – 4455 BC
- Franz Joseph Lauth (1869) – 4157 BC
- Auguste Mariette (1871) – 5004 BC
- James Strong (1878) – 2515 BC
- Flinders Petrie (1887) – 4777 BC

Modern consensus dates the era of Menes or the start of the first dynasty between c. 3200 and 3030 BC; some academic literature uses c. 3000 BC.

== History ==
Ebony plaque of Narmer from his tomb of Abydos
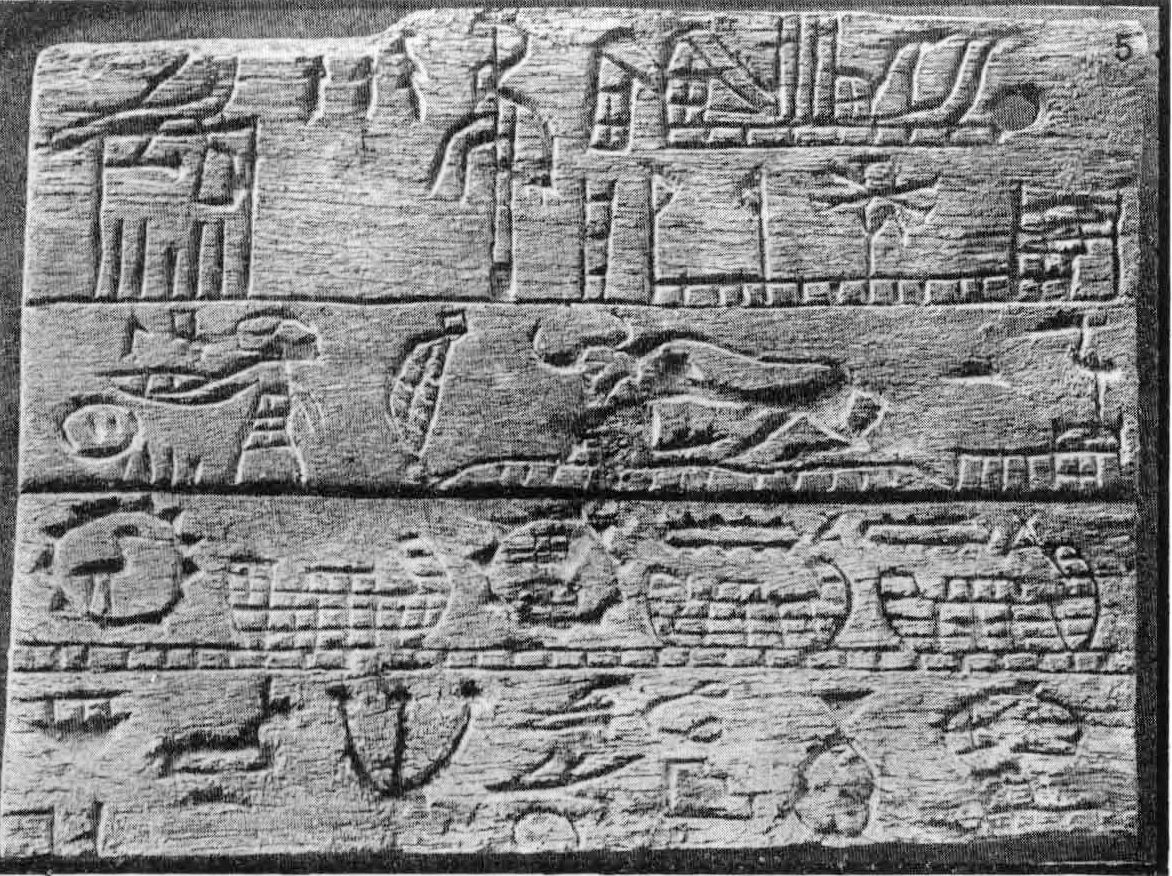
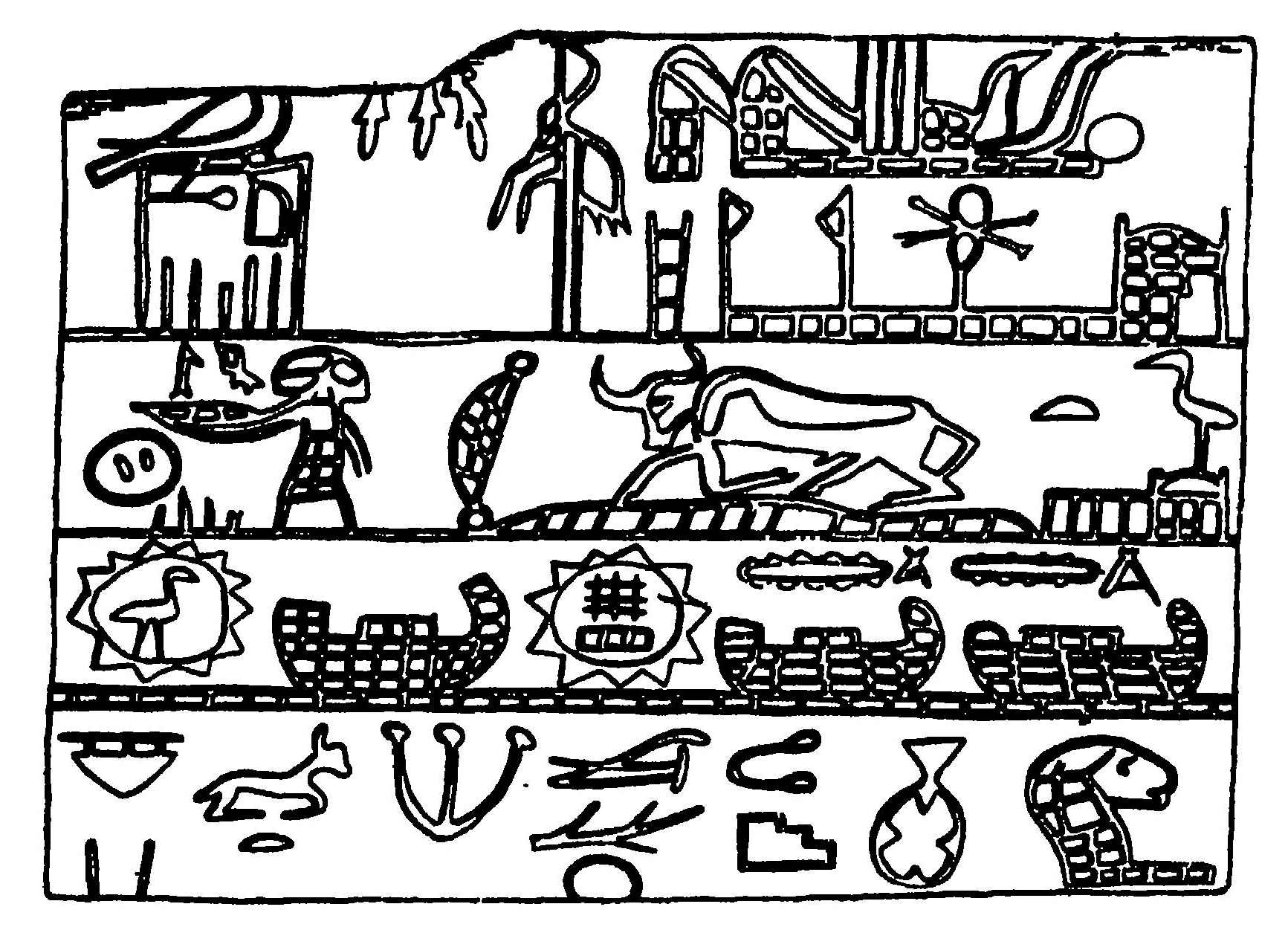

Ancient tradition ascribes to Menes to uniting Upper and Lower Egypt into a single kingdom and becoming the first pharaoh of the First Dynasty. Although Menes does not appear on extant pieces of the Royal Annals (Cairo Stone and Palermo Stone), his name appears in later sources as the first ruler of Egypt. Some sources credit him as directly inheriting the throne from the god Horus. He also appears in later dated king's lists, always as the first human pharaoh of Egypt. Menes appears in demotic novels of the Hellenistic period, demonstrating that, even that late, he was regarded as an important figure.

Menes was seen as a founding figure for much of the history of ancient Egypt, similar to Romulus in ancient Rome. Manetho records that Menes "led the army across the frontier and won great glory".

=== Capital ===
Manetho associates the city of Thinis with the Early Dynastic Period and, in particular, Menes, a "Thinite" or native of Thinis. Herodotus contradicts Manetho in stating that Menes founded the city of Memphis as his capital after diverting the course of the Nile through the construction of a levee. Manetho ascribes the building of Memphis to Menes' son, Athothis, and calls no pharaohs earlier than Third Dynasty "Memphite".

Herodotus and Manetho's stories of the foundation of Memphis are probably later inventions: in 2012 a relief mentioning the visit to Memphis by Iry-Hor—a predynastic ruler of Upper Egypt reigning before Narmer—was discovered in the Sinai Peninsula, indicating that the city was already in existence in the early 32nd century BC.

=== Cultural influence ===
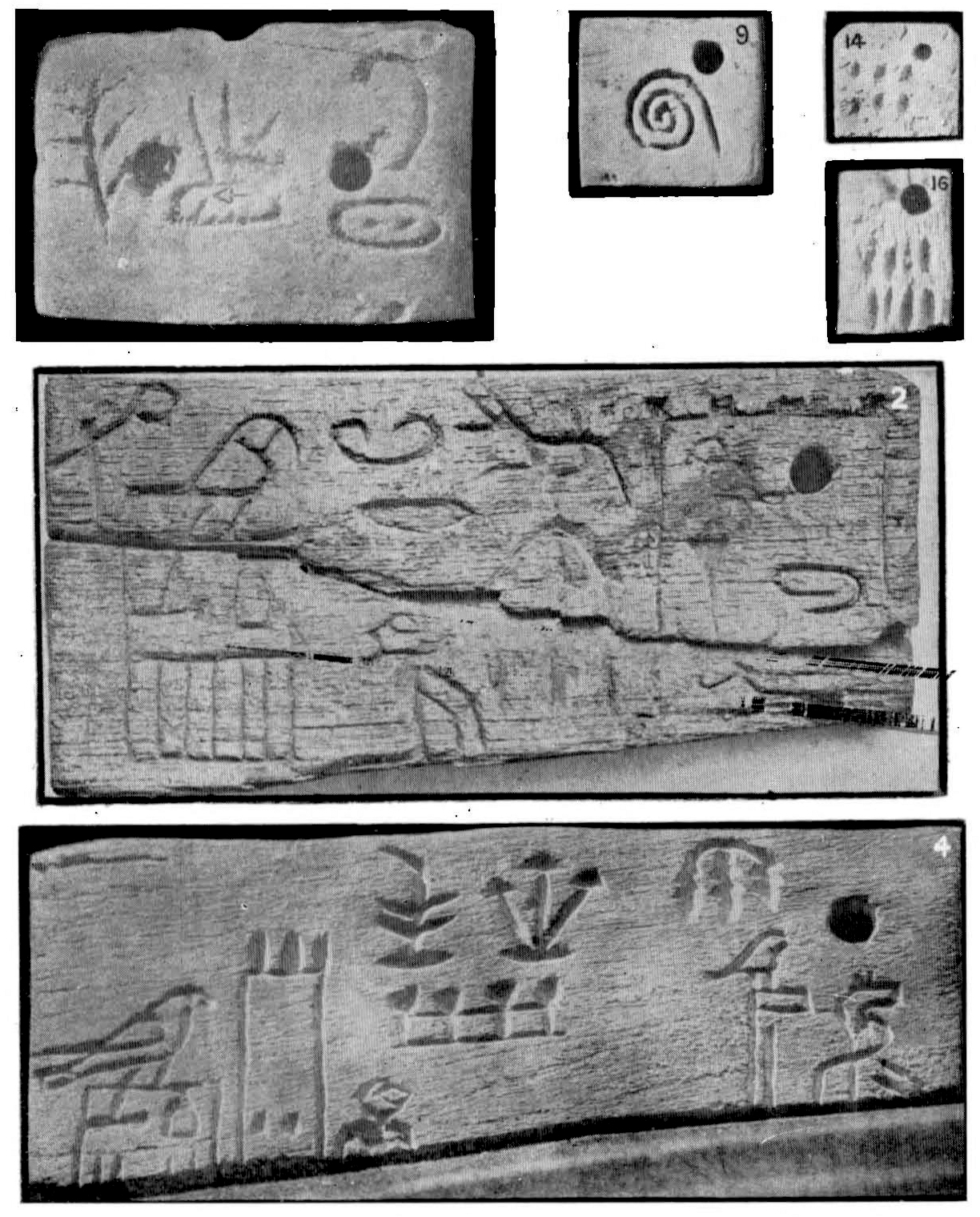
Labels from the tomb of Narmer

Diodorus Siculus stated that Menes had introduced the worship of the gods and the practice of sacrifice as well as a more elegant and luxurious style of living. For this latter invention, Menes' memory was dishonoured by the Twenty-fourth Dynasty pharaoh Tefnakht and Plutarch mentions a pillar at Thebes on which was inscribed an imprecation against Menes as the introducer of luxury.

In Pliny the Elder's account, Menes was credited with being the inventor of writing in Egypt.

=== Crocodile episode ===
Diodorus Siculus recorded a story of Menes related by the priests of the crocodile god Sobek at Crocodilopolis, in which the pharaoh Menes, attacked by his own dogs while out hunting, fled across Lake Moeris on the back of a crocodile and, in thanks, founded the city of Crocodilopolis.

Gaston Maspero (1910), while acknowledging the possibility that traditions relating to other kings may have become mixed up with this story, dismisses the suggestions of some commentators that the story should be transferred to the Twelfth Dynasty pharaoh Amenemhat III and sees no reason to doubt that Diodorus correctly recorded a tradition of Menes. Later, Edwards (1971) states that "the legend, which is obviously filled with anachronisms, is patently devoid of historical value".

=== Death ===
According to Manetho, Menes reigned for either 30, 60 or 62 years and was killed by a hippopotamus.

== In popular culture ==
Alexander Dow (1735/36–1779), a Scottish orientalist and playwright, wrote the tragedy Sethona, set in ancient Egypt. The lead part of Menes is described in the dramatis personæ as "next male-heir to the crown" now worn by Seraphis, and was played by Samuel Reddish in a 1774 production by David Garrick at the Theatre Royal, Drury Lane.

In Hobby Japan's Queen's Blade media franchise, there is a character named Menace. Her name is a play on the ancient Egyptian ruler Menes. She is depicted wearing an outfit inspired by Ancient Egyptian fashion.

== See also ==
- First Dynasty of Egypt family tree
- Hor-Aha
- Min (god)
- Minos, king of Crete, son of Zeus and Europa
- Mannus, ancestral figure in Germanic mythology
- Manu (Hinduism), Progenitor of humanity

== General and cited references ==
- Beck, Roger B; Black, Linda; Krieger, Larry S; Naylor, Phillip C; Shabaka, Dahia Ibo (1999), World history: Patterns of interaction, Evanston, IL: McDougal Littell, ISBN 0-395-87274-X
- Borchardt, Ludwig (1897), Ein Kapitel Zur Geschichte Des Pflanzenornaments
- Cervelló-Autuori, Josep (2003), "Narmer, Menes and the seals from Abydos", Egyptology at the dawn of the twenty-first century: proceedings of the Eighth International Congress of Egyptologists, vol. 2, Cairo: The American University in Cairo Press, ISBN 978-977-424-714-9.
- Cervelló-Autuori, Josep (2005), "Was King Narmer Menes?", Archéo-Nil, 15: 31–46, doi:10.3406/ARNIL.2005.896.
- Diodorus Siculus, Bibliotheca historica, vol. 1
- Dow, Alexander (1774), Sethona: a tragedy, as it is performed at the Theatre Royal in Drury Lane, Collection of plays. [1767-1802] ;v. 1, no. 5, London: T. Becket, hdl:2027/uc2.ark:/13960/t2z31pr8f
- Edwards, IES (1971), "The early dynastic period in Egypt", The Cambridge Ancient History, vol. 1, Cambridge: Cambridge University Press.
- Elder, Edward (1849), "Menes", in Smith, William (ed.), Dictionary of Greek and Roman biography and mythology, vol. 2, Boston: Charles C. Little & James Brown.
- Faber, George Stanley (1816), "The origin of pagan idolatry: ascertained from historical testimony and circumstantial evidence", 3, vol. 2, London: F&C Rivingtons.
- Gardiner, Alan (1961), Egypt of the Pharaohs, Oxford: Oxford University Press.
- of Halicarnassus, Herodotus, The Histories.
- Heagy, Thomas C. (2014), "Who was Menes?", Archeo-Nil, 24: 59–92. Available online "[1]". Archived from the original on 2017-09-01..
- Helck, W. (1953), "Gab es einen König Menes?", Zeitschrift der Deutschen Morgenländischen Gesellschaft, 103, n.s. 28: 354–359.* Kinnaer, Jacques (2003), "The Naqada label and the identification of Menes", Göttinger Miszellen, 196: 23–30.
- Lloyd, Alan B. (1994) [1975], Herodotus: Book II, Leiden: EJ Brill, ISBN 90-04-04179-6.
- Maspero, Gaston (1903), Sayce, Archibald Henry (ed.), History of Egypt, Chaldea, Syria, Babylonia, and Assyria, vol. 9, Kessinger Publishing, ISBN 9780766135017.
- ——— (1910) [1894], Sayce, Archibald Henry (ed.), The dawn of civilization: Egypt and Chaldæa, translated by McClure, M L, London: Society for Promoting Christian Knowledge, ISBN 978-0-7661-7774-1.
- Manley, Bill (1997), The Penguin Historical Atlas of Ancient Egypt, London: Penguin, ISBN 0-14-051331-0.
- Newberry, Percy E. (1929), "Menes: the founder of the Egyptian monarchy (circa 3400 B.C.)", in Anonymous (ed.), Great ones of ancient Egypt: portraits by Winifred Brunton, historical studies by various Egyptologists, London: Hodder and Stoughton, pp. 37–53.
- Rachewiltz, Boris de (1969), "Pagan and magic elements in Ezra Pound's works", in Hesse, Eva (ed.), New approaches to Ezra Pound, Berkeley, CA: University of California Press.
- Ryholt, Kim (2009), "Egyptian historical literature from the Greco-Roman period", in Fitzenreiter, Martin (ed.), Das Ereignis, Geschichtsschreibung zwischen Vorfall und Befund, London: Golden House.
- Schulz, Regine; Seidel, Matthias (2004), Egypt: The World of the Pharaohs, HF Ullmann, ISBN 978-3-8331-6000-4.
- Shaw, Ian; Nicholson, Paul (1995), The Dictionary of Ancient Egypt, Harry N Abrams, ISBN 0-8109-9096-2.
- Seidlmayer, Stephan (2010) [2004], "The Rise of the State to the Second Dynasty", Egypt: The World of the Pharaohs, H.f.ullmann, ISBN 978-3-8331-6000-4.
- Verbrugghe, Gerald Paul; Wickersham, John Moore (2001) [1996], Berossos and Manetho, introduced and translated: Native Traditions in Ancient Mesopotamia and Egypt, Ann Arbor: The University of Michigan Press, ISBN 978-0-472-08687-0.
- Waddell, Laurence A (1930), Egyptian civilization: Its Sumerian origin, London: Kessinger Publishing, ISBN 978-0-7661-4273-2.
