= The Greatest Pharaohs =

- Directed by: Scott Paddor and Wayne Grajeda
- Written by: Scott Paddor and Wayne Grajeda
- Produced by: Scott Paddor and Wayne Grajeda
- Starring: Frank Langella; Commentators: Cathleen A. Keller– UC Berkeley; David O'Connor– New York University; Peter A. Clayton– historian/author David Silverman– University of Pennsylvania; Lynn Holden– Rosicrucian Egyptian Museum; Richard Fazzini, Donald Spanel- Brooklyn Museum; Josef Wegner- University of Pennsylvania; Carol Redmount- University of California, Berkeley Lucy Hughes-Hallett
- Narrated by: Frank Langella
- Cinematography: Paul Johnson
- Edited by: Michael W. Andrews
- Music by: Christopher L. Stone; Zeijko Marasovich
- Distributed by: A&E Television Networks
- Release date: July 11, 1997
- Running time: 200 minutes
- Country: United States
- Language: English

The Greatest Pharaohs is a 1997 American educational documentary film about Ancient Egypt distributed by A&E and narrated by Frank Langella with commentary by experts in the field. It is 200 minutes long and split into four parts, with each part explaining the lives of four Egyptian pharaohs.

== In education ==
The film uses interviews of historians, re-creations through CGI, location footage, and archaeological and scientific evidence to tell the story of these Egyptian monarchs. It has been made available for instructional use by A&E, and is now being used in anthropology and archaeology courses at colleges and universities, such as the University of Vermont, San Francisco State University, Oriental Institute of Chicago, University of Pennsylvania, and University of California, Berkeley, as well as smaller colleges such as Blue Ridge Community College. It is available in public libraries across the United States, and in archives such as La Bibliographie nationale française.

== 4-part series ==
The documentary series The Greatest Pharaohs chronicles the lives of the men and women who built and maintained the Egyptian dynasties and the resources and power of ancient Egypt. Footage is included of the recently opened pyramid complex of the Pharaoh Sneferu and the rarely seen ancient burial ground of Abydos.

Part 1

Follows the birth of Egyptian civilization and the origins of the pharaohs and their legacy of the pyramids. It begins with the story of how the first pharaoh, the warrior Narmer, united Upper and Lower Egypt and began the first dynasty. Covers Narmer, Hor-Aha, Djoser, Sneferu, and Khafre.

Part 2

By 2180 BCE, almost 1,000 years after the first pharaoh, the Egyptians had made advances in science, art, and technology and had built what was arguably the most advanced culture at that time in civilized history. However, the Old Kingdom started to decay when a child became Pharaoh. There were centuries of chaos before Egypt was reborn under a series of militarily inclined pharaohs who established the New Kingdom. Covers Menkaura, Pepi II, Mentuhotep II, and Ahmose I.

Part 3

By 1353 BCE, Egypt was again stable, with much of the prosperity of the Old Kingdom. However, the ascension of Akhenaten brought a new crisis. Akhenaten was branded a heretic by history because of his attempts to transform Egypt's religion, but he was also considered remarkable by the way he shared power with Nefertiti. Covers Amenhotep IV (Akhenaten), Tuthmosis III, Tutankhamun, Ay, and Seti I.

Part 4

Considered by historians to be the greatest era of the New Kingdom began in 1279 BCE, when Ramses II assumed the throne. Ramses II is remembered by history as Ramses the Great. The Great Pharaohs of Egypt series concludes with an in-depth look at his 67-year reign. He led foreign conquests and embarked on what is considered the most ambitious building program since the Great Pyramids, restoring old monuments and erecting countless new ones. The program concludes with the life and death of Cleopatra as the last pharaoh. Covers Ramses II, Ramses III, and Cleopatra VII.

== Video release ==
It was released by A&E Home Video and distributed in the U.S. by New Video Group (1997).

== Additional sources ==
- The Advocate (July 6, 1997), "Tidbits in A&E's "Pharaohs" worth the effort"
