= Khenthap =

Ancient Egyptian queen consort

Queen consort of Egypt
- Spouse: Pharaoh Hor-Aha
- Issue: Djer
- Dynasty: First Dynasty of Egypt

Khenthap (also written Khenet-Hapi) was a possible queen of Ancient Egypt. She is said to have lived during the 1st Dynasty. Her historical figure is very obscure, since there are no contemporary sources for her name. She appears only once in a much later inscription.

== Evidence ==
Egyptologists and historians are still debating as to who Khenthap was as a historical figure. The archaeologically recorded seal impressions from first dynasty tombs at Abydos never mention her. She appears only in an inscription on the Palermo stone, a stela made of black schist that lists the kings from Narmer (1st Dynasty) up to king Neferirkare (6th Dynasty). Additionally, the stone lists the mother of each king. The inscription spells out Khenthap's name, but doesn't record any of her titles (except for that of a "mother").

== Biography ==
The inscription on the Cairo fragment describes Khenthap as the mother of king Djer. Joyce Tyldesley thinks Khenthap was a wife of king Hor-Aha and that her grandson was king Djet, for Djet is thought to be the son of king Djer (Aha's son). Silke Roth instead thinks that Khenthap was a wife of king Teti I, a king mentioned in the Saqqara Tablet and in the Royal Canon of Turin. In the latter, he is described as a ruler who held the Egyptian throne for only 1 year and 45 days.

Khenthap's name means "musician of (god) Hapi", which may point to a religious and cultic role for this lady during her lifetime. Her name is connected to a god and may link to the king's title "bull of his mother".
