= Djet =

Ancient Egyptian Pharaoh of first dynasty

- Wadjet, Wadj, Zet, Uadji, Ouenephes, Vavenephis
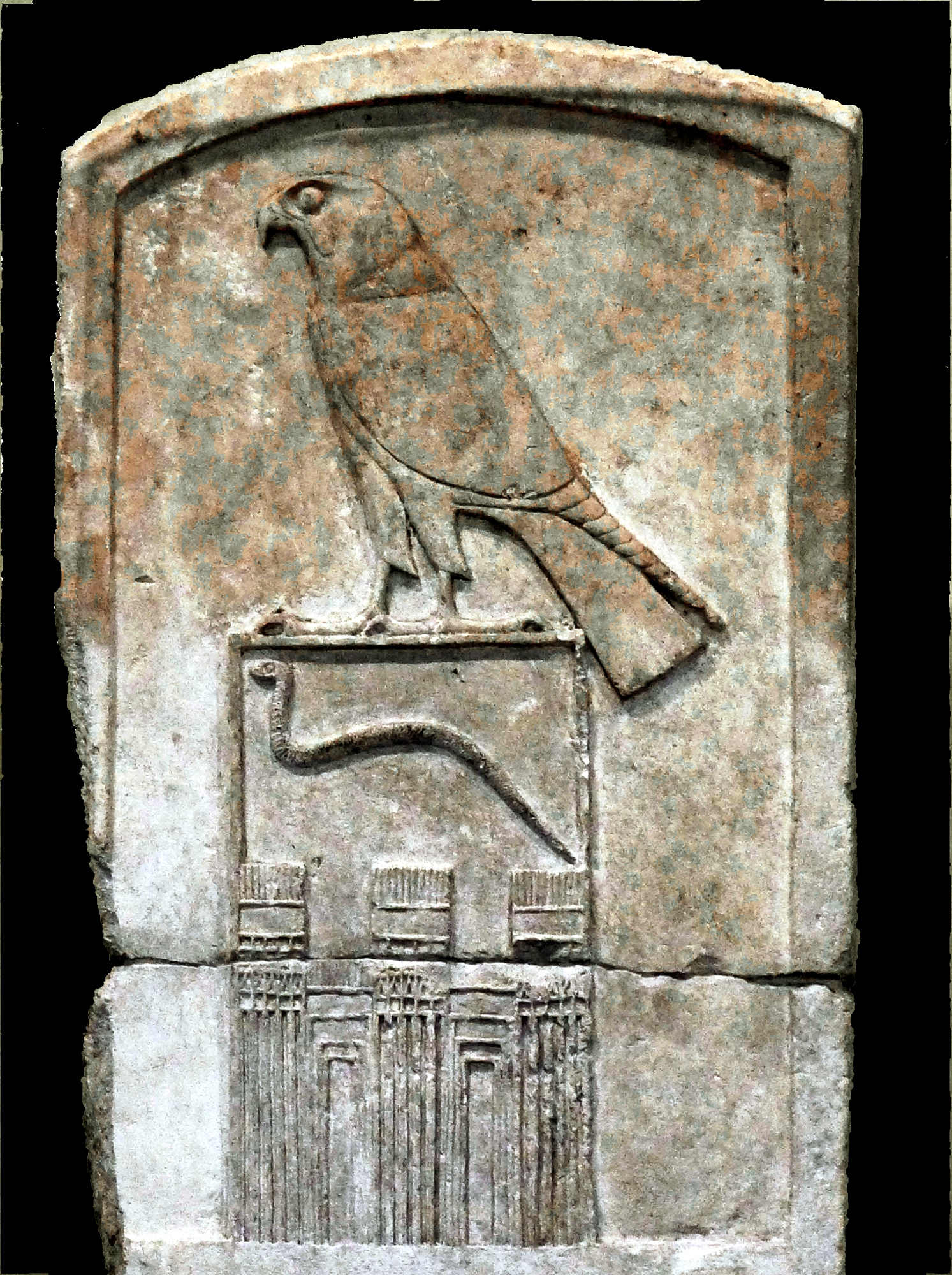
- The famous stela of King Djet which once stood next to his tomb in the Umm el-Qa'ab, Louvre Museum.

Pharaoh
- Reign: c. 10-16 years, c. 2980 BC
- Predecessor: Djer
- Successor: Merneith, Den
Royal titulary
Horus name
Hor-Djet
Ḥr-ḏt
Serpent of Horus
G5	I10
Second Horus name: Hor-Wadjet (rare—only one example exists)
Ḥr-wꜢḏ-ḏt
Reinvigorated serpent of Horus
G5	M13 I10
Prenomen
Nisut-Bity-Itu
nsw.t-bjtj-Jttjw
King of Upper and Lower Egypt, the buzzard has come
M23 t L2 t M17 X1 G4
Abydos King List
Ita
jtꜣ
The vulture has come
< M17 X1 G1 >
Turin King List
...tjuj
...tjwj
The buzzard has come
< HASH G4 M17 > G7
- Consorts: Merneith, Ahaneith?
- Children: Den
- Father: Djer
- Mother: Herneith?, Nakhtneith?
- Burial: Tomb Z, Umm el-Qa'ab
- Dynasty: First Dynasty

Djet, also known as Wadjet, Wadj, Zet, and Uadji (in Greek possibly the pharaoh known as Uenephes or possibly Atothis; fl. c. 2980 BC), was the fourth pharaoh of the First Dynasty, successor of Djer. Djet's Horus name means "Horus Cobra" or "Serpent of Horus".

== Family ==
Djet's queen was his sister Merneith, who may have ruled as a pharaoh in her own right after his death. There is a possibility that a woman known as Ahaneith was also one of his wives. Djet and Merneith's son was Den, and their grandson was Anedjib.

== Reign ==
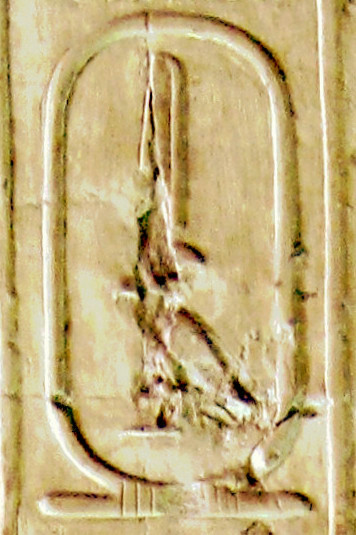
Ita, cartouche name of Djet in the Abydos king list.

How long Djet ruled is unknown. Only one Seker festival is attested by ivory labels dating to his reign, whose duration is estimated to be anywhere between six and ten years. According to Wolfgang Helck he reigned 10 years, though various reconstructions of the Palermo Stone suggest a reign between 12 and 16 years.

Details of Djet's reign are lost in the lacunas of the Palermo Stone. However, finds of vessel fragments and seal impressions prove that there were intense trading activities with Syria and Canaan at the time. Graves at Tarkhan and Saqqara dating to his reign yielded pottery from Canaan. Other activities can be inferred from the only two known years tablets of the ruler, one of which is preserved in two copies. The reading of the events described on the tablets is highly problematic. Helck translated: "Year of the planning of the underground/basement (?) of the dual plant, birth of lotus buds, standing in the crown shrine of the two Ladies." The other year tablet mentions a victory, the production (birth) of a statue and perhaps the creation of a fortress. Finally, in Marsa Alam in Nubia, the short inscription "Hemka" below "Djet" was discovered. Djet ran an expedition to the Red Sea during his reign, likely to exploit the mines in the Eastern Desert.

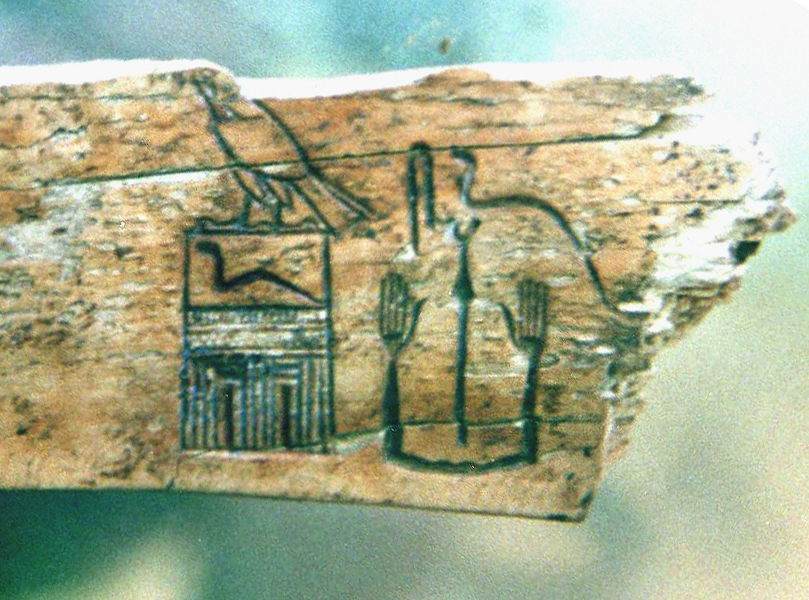
Fragment of an object bearing the serekh of Djet and the name of a court official Sekhemkasedj, Egyptian Museum.

Clay seals prove that the official Amka begun his career under King Djer, as manager of the "Hor-sekhenti-dju" estate. Under Djet, Amka became royal steward. In the early years of the king's successor Amka died after he was appointed to regional responsibilities in the western Nile Delta. Other senior officials under Djet were Sekhemkasedj and Setka.

Manetho mentions that in his reign a great famine seized Egypt. He also says that he erected pyramids near Kôchômê.

== Tomb ==
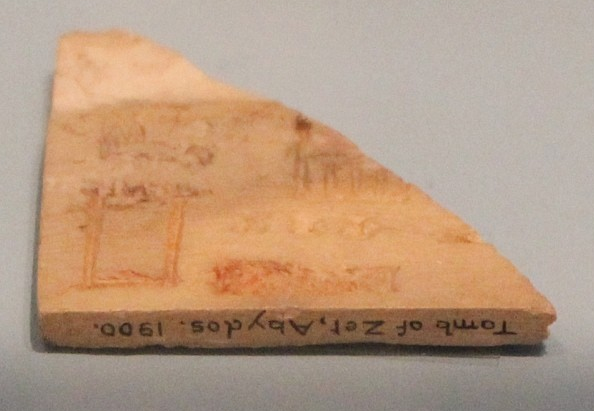
Label of King Djet (Ashmolean). Abydos, Umm el-Qaab, Tomb Z.

Names found in subsidiary graves surrounding Tomb Z.

Djet's tomb is located at Abydos in Petrie's Tomb Z. It is located west of his father, King Djer's tomb. Surrounding Djet's tomb are 174 subsidiary burials most of them being retainers that were sacrificed upon Djet's death to serve him in the afterlife. Found within Djet's tomb was a stele. This stele was a snake surmounted by a falcon (Horus) and could be interpreted to mean "Horus the snake". Also found within the tomb was an ivory comb with the name of Djet on it, along with a picture of the stele. Copper tools and pottery were also found in the tomb, a common find in Egyptian tombs. There is evidence that Djet's tomb was intentionally burned, along with other tombs at Abydos from this time period. The tombs were later renovated because of the association with the cult of Osiris.

Djet owes his fame to the survival, in well-preserved form, of one of his artistically refined tomb steles. It is carved in relief with Djet's Horus name, and shows that the distinct Egyptian style had already become fully developed at that time. This stela was discovered in 1904 by Émile Amélineau and is today on display at the Louvre museum. Another artistic landmark dated to Djet's reign is his ivory comb now housed in the Egyptian Museum. It is the earliest surviving depiction of the heavens symbolised by the outspread wings of a falcon. The wings carry the bark of Seker, below the celestial bark Djet's serekh is surrounded by two Was scepters and one Ankh-sign.

== See also ==
- List of Pharaohs
- Ancient Egyptian retainer sacrifices

== Bibliography ==
- Toby A. H. Wilkinson, Early Dynastic Egypt, Routledge, London/New York 1999, ISBN 0-415-18633-1, 73–74
- Toby A. H. Wilkinson, Royal Annals of Ancient Egypt: The Palermo Stone and Its Associated Fragments, (Kegan Paul International), 2000.
- Manetho (1940), Manetho, translated by Wadell, W.G., Cambridge

Preceded by Djer	Pharaoh of Egypt c. 2980 BC	Succeeded by Merneith
