= First Dynasty of Egypt =

Dynasty of ancient Egypt

- c. 3100 BC–c. 2900 BC
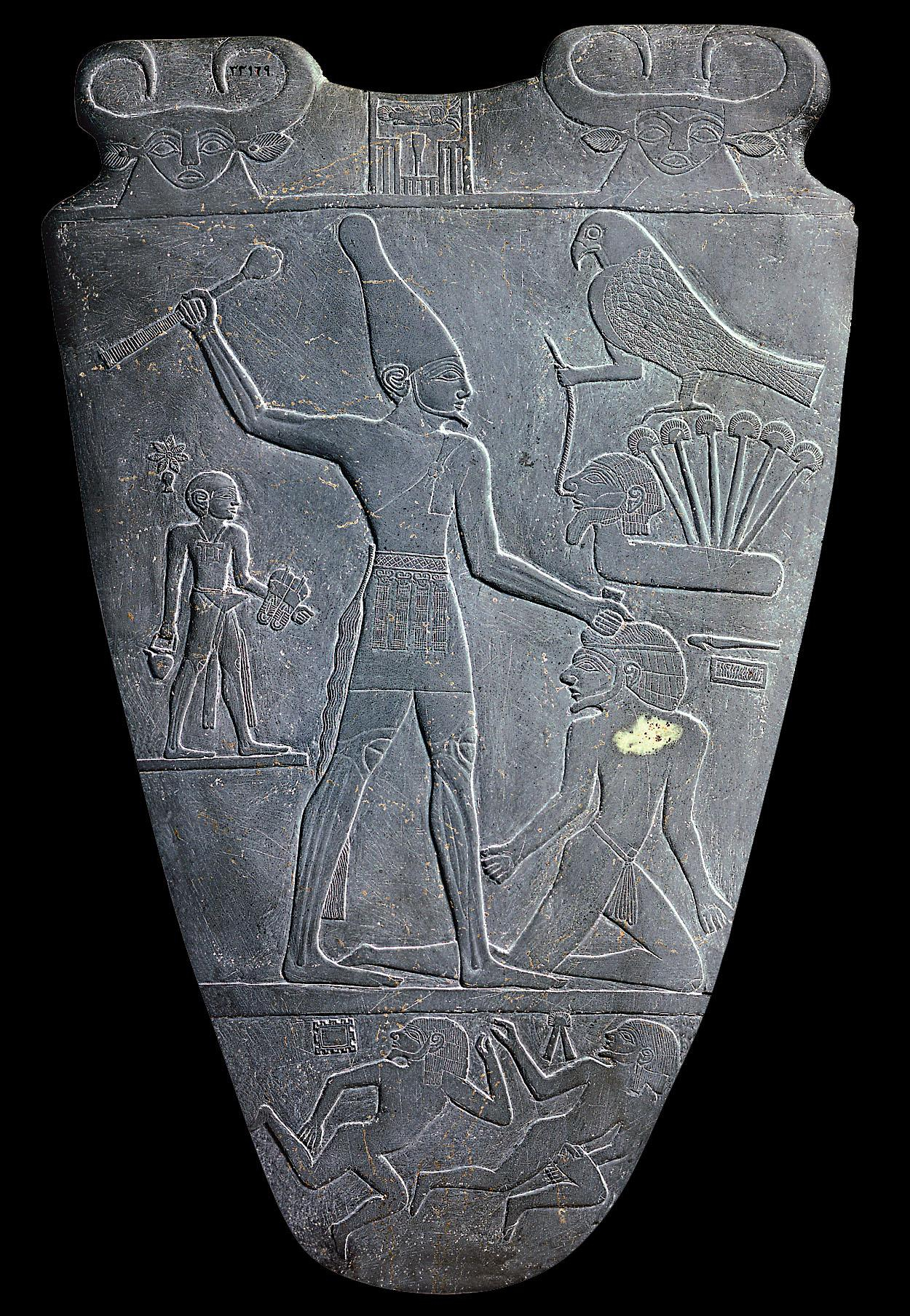
- Narmer Palette (c. 3200–3000 BC)
- Capital: Thinis
- Common languages: Egyptian language
- Religion: Ancient Egyptian religion
- Government: Absolute monarchy
- Historical era: Bronze Age
  - Established: c. 3100 BC
  - Disestablished: c. 2900 BC
Preceded by	Succeeded by
Protodynastic Egypt; Dynasty 0	Second Dynasty of Egypt

The First Dynasty of ancient Egypt (Dynasty I) covers the first series of Egyptian kings to rule over a unified Egypt. It immediately follows the unification of Upper and Lower Egypt, by Menes, or Narmer, and marks the beginning of the Early Dynastic Period, when power was centered at Thinis.

The date of this period is subject to scholarly debate about the Egyptian chronology. It falls within the early Bronze Age and is variously estimated to have begun anywhere between the 34th and the 30th centuries BC. In a 2013 study based on radiocarbon dates, the accession of Hor-Aha, the second king of the First Dynasty, was placed between 3111 and 3045 BC with 68% confidence, and between 3218 and 3035 with 95% confidence. The same study placed the accession of Den, the sixth king of the dynasty, between 2928 and 2911 BC with 68% confidence, although a 2023 radiocarbon analysis placed Den's accession potentially earlier, between 3011 and 2921, within a broader window of 3104 to 2913.

== The dynasty ==
Information about this dynasty is derived from a few monuments and other objects bearing royal names, the most important being the Narmer Palette and Narmer Macehead, as well as Den and Qa'a king lists. No detailed records of the first two dynasties have survived, except for the terse lists on the Palermo Stone. The account in Manetho's Aegyptiaca contradicts both the archeological evidence and the other historical records: Manetho names nine rulers of the First Dynasty, only one of whose names matches the other sources, and offers information for only four of them. Egyptian hieroglyphs at this point were in their early stages, used primarily for labels and names, as seen on the Narmer Palette.

Alena Buis noted:

"Large tombs of pharaohs at Abydos and Naqada, in addition to cemeteries at Saqqara and Helwan near Memphis, reveal structures built largely of wood and mud bricks, with some small use of stone for walls and floors. Stone was used in quantity for the manufacture of ornaments, vessels, and occasionally, for statues. Tamarix ("tamarisk" or "salt cedar") was used to build boats such as the Abydos boats. One of the most important indigenous woodworking techniques was the fixed mortise and tenon joint. A fixed tenon was made by shaping the end of one timber to fit into a mortise (hole) that is cut into a second timber. A variation of this joint using a free tenon eventually became one of the most important features in Mediterranean and Egyptian shipbuilding. It creates a union between two planks or other components by inserting a separate tenon into a cavity (mortise) of the corresponding size cut into each component."

— Alena Buis, PhD

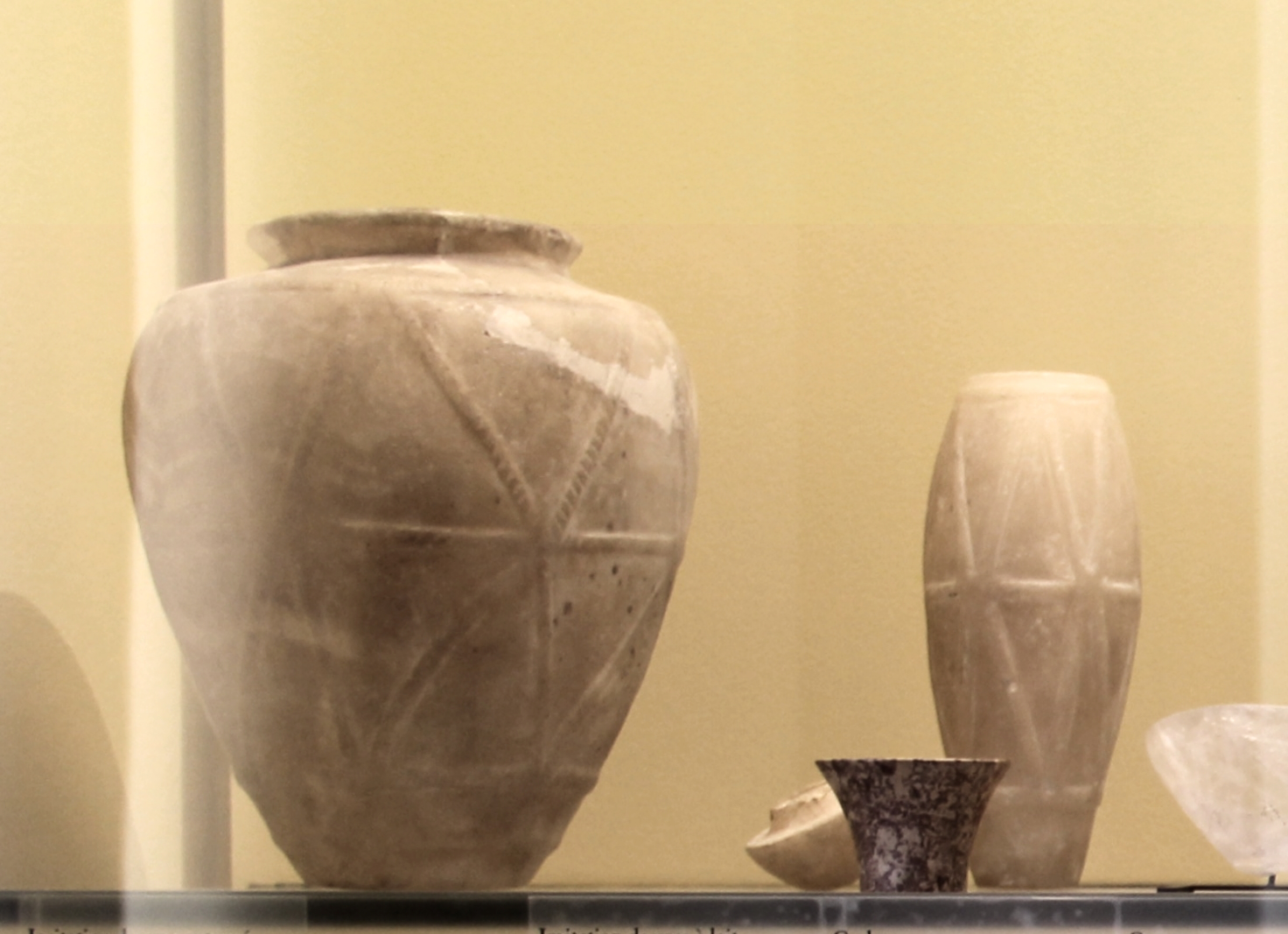
Alabaster vessels from a 1st Dynasty cemetery, Abu Roach. Louvre Museum AF 9149, AF 9148

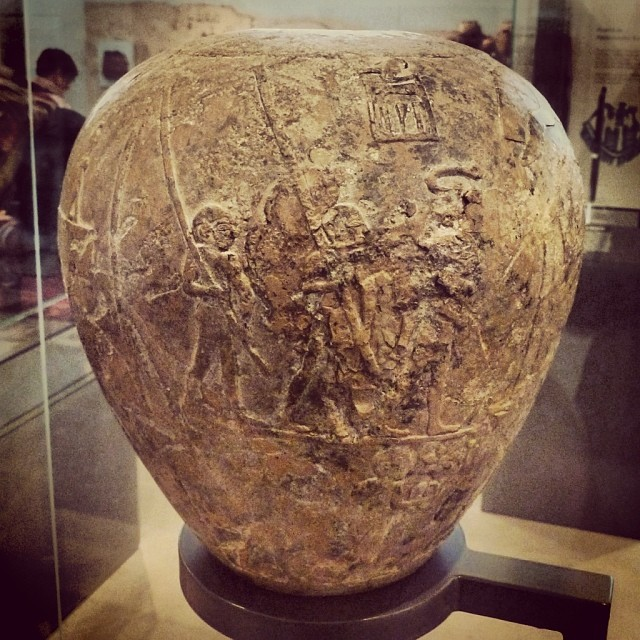
Narmer Macehead

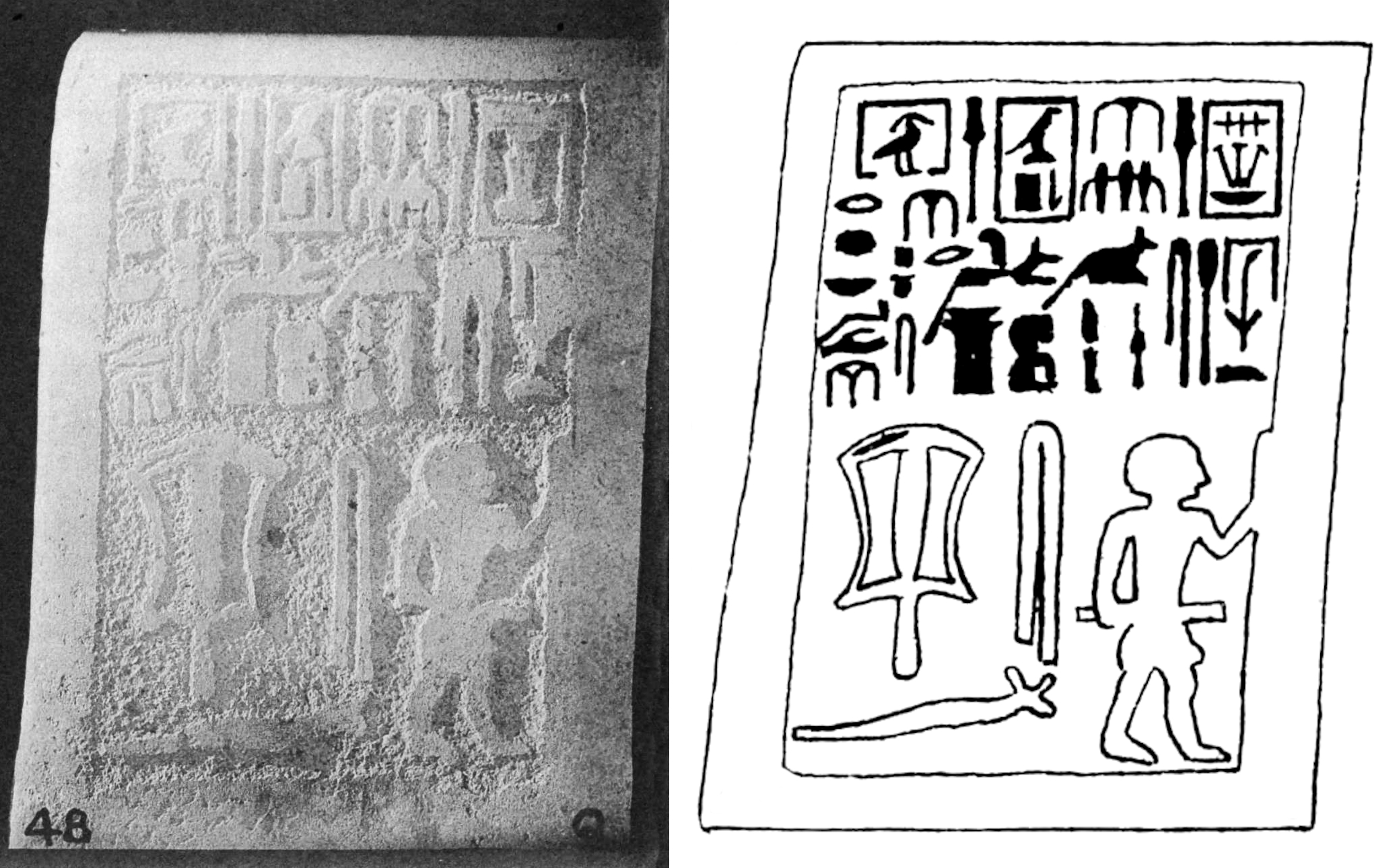
Sabef stela in incipient hieroglyphs. Reign of Qa'a, end of the 1st Dynasty, c. 2910 BC. The stela of Merka is similar.

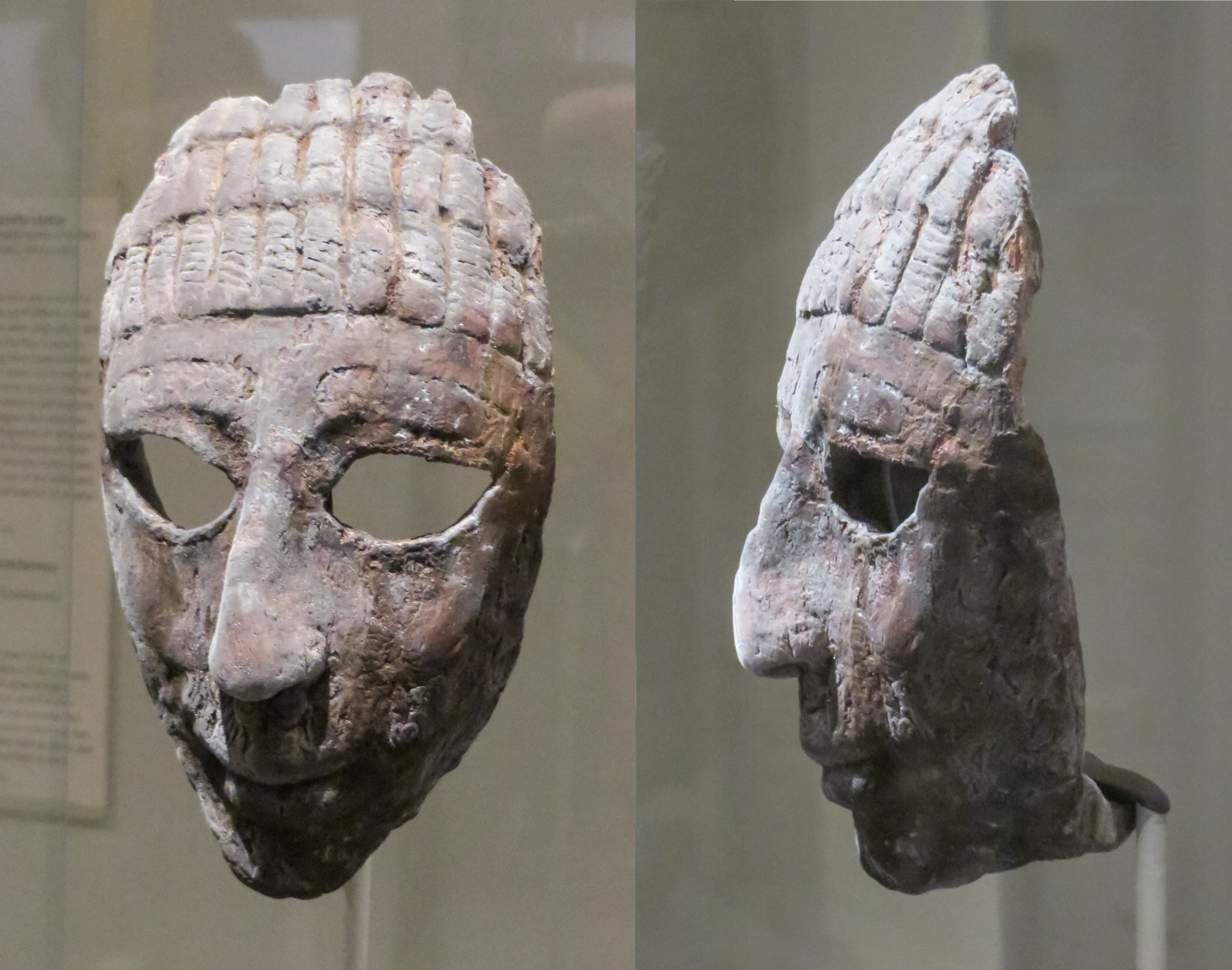
Depiction of King Den. Composite statue found within Tomb T at Umm el-Qa'ab

== Conflicts ==
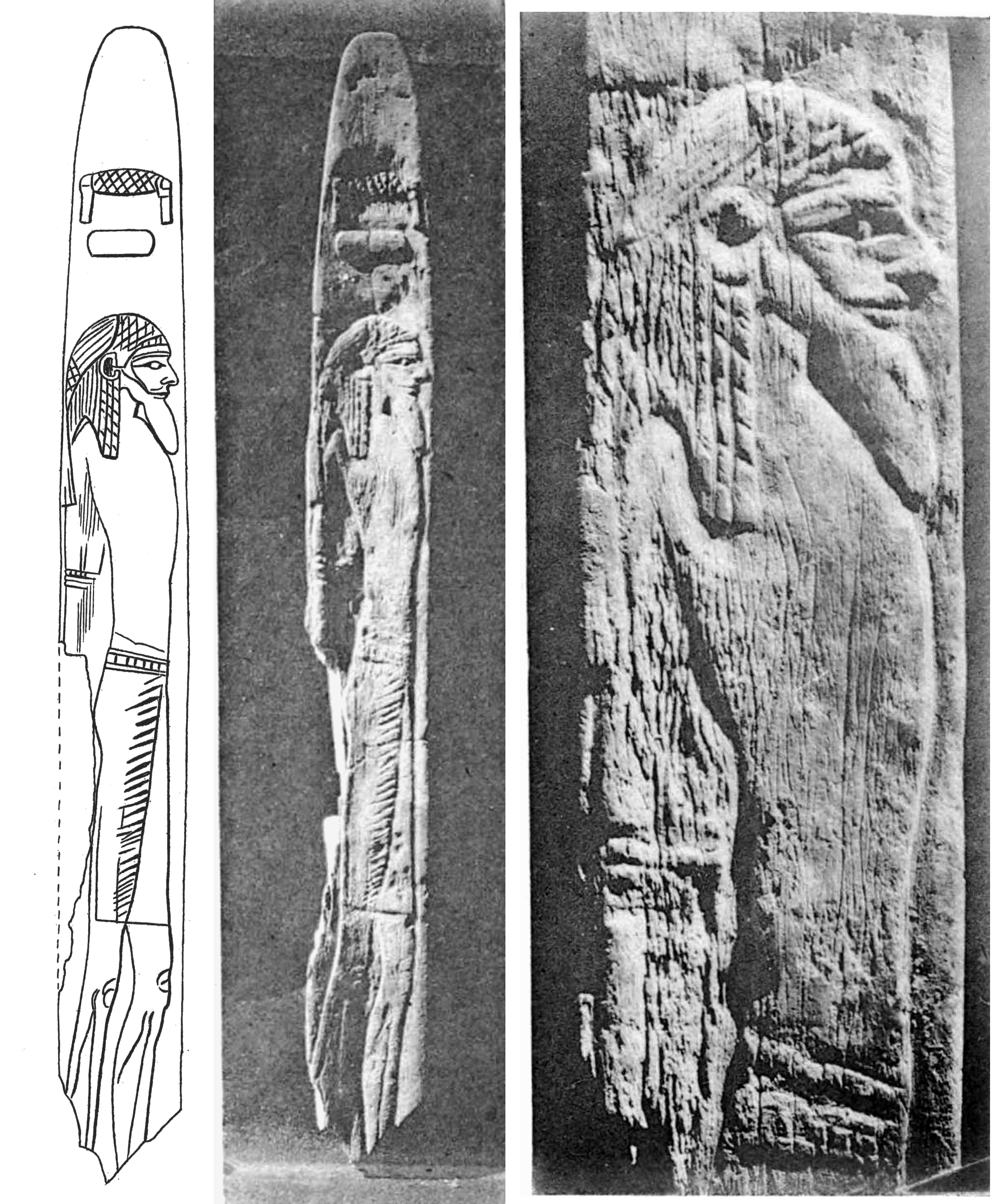
Asiatic prisoner. Abydos ivory tablet from the tomb of King Qa'a (c. 2910 BC)

Artifacts of the First Dynasty contain numerous depictions of captured foreigners, possibly alluding to the campaign to conquer Lower Egypt and the Nile Delta, and the accomplishment of the unification of Upper and Lower Egypt. Various ethnic types seem to be represented: Asiatic-looking foreigners with full beards and straight hair, possibly alluding to vanquished people from the eastern parts of the Nile delta, or naked individuals with curly hair, possibly Libyan tribes from the western Nile delta. Depiction of West-Asiatic-looking foreigners were found in the tomb of Pharaoh Qa'a, and the Narmer Palette also exhibits similar scenes of conquest over alien people.

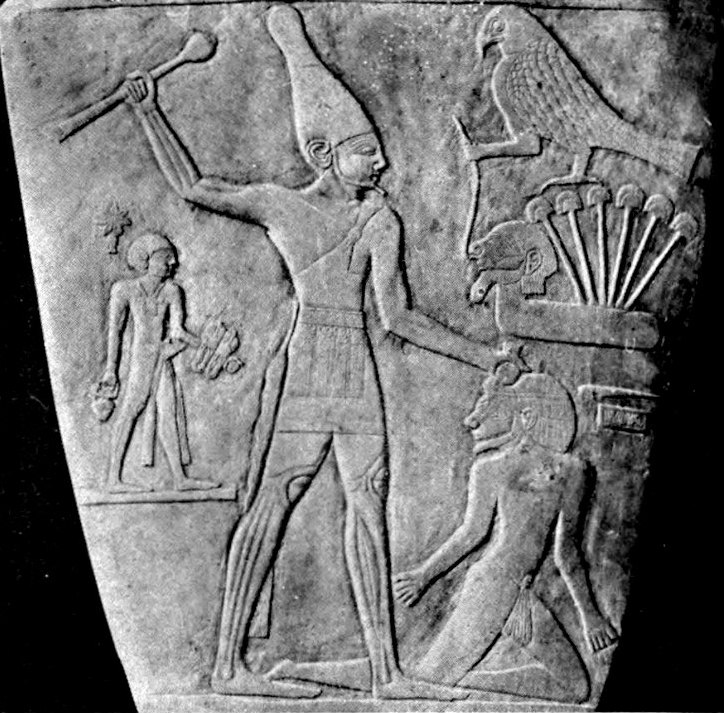
The Narmer Palette, Pharaoh Narmer subduing an enemy

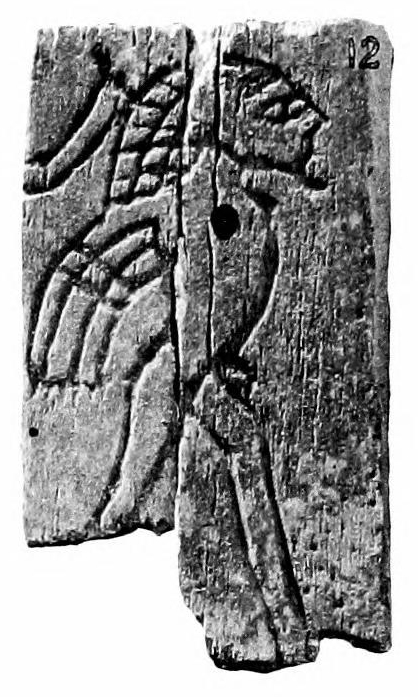
Naked captive with feather in the hair. First dynasty of Egypt, Tomb of Menes B17, Abydos.

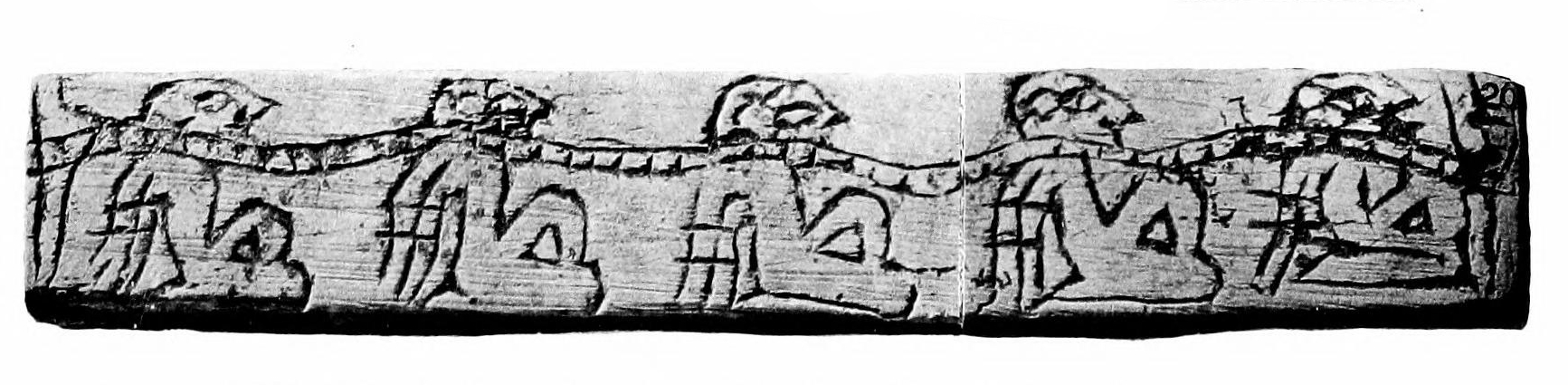
Group of captives. First Dynasty of Egypt, Menes or earlier.

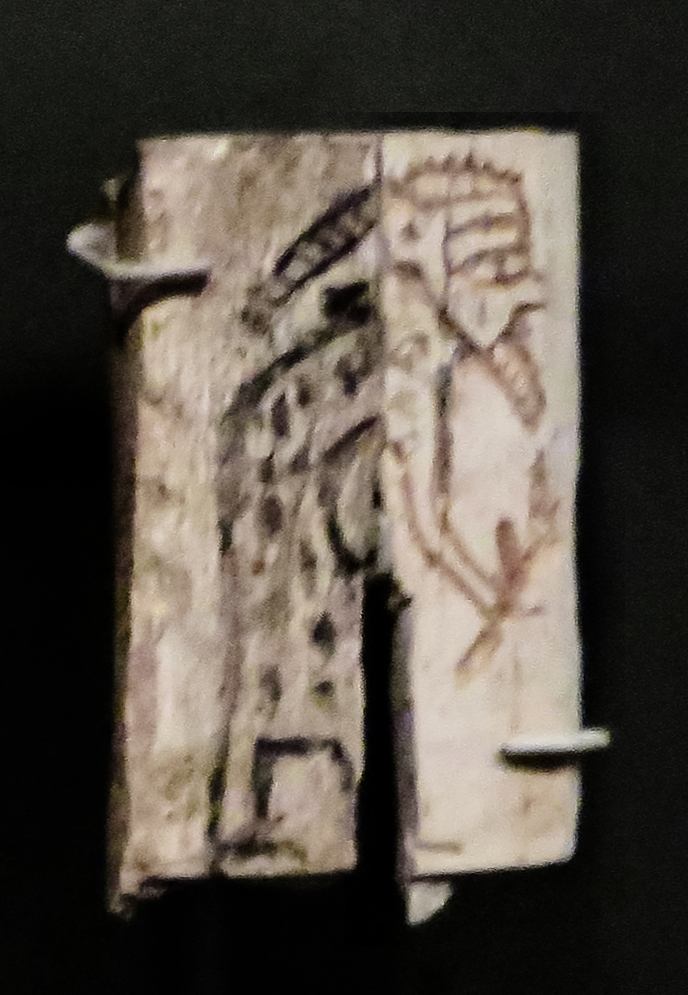
Vassal subject with headdress and spotted robe, possibly a Libyan, paying homage. First Dynasty, 2960–2770, Tomb of Menes B17, Abydos.

== Human sacrifice ==
Names found on the south side of subsidiary graves surrounding Djet's tomb

Human sacrifice was practiced as part of the funerary rituals associated with all of the pharaohs of the first dynasty. It is clearly demonstrated as existing during this dynasty by retainers being buried near each pharaoh's tomb as well as animals sacrificed for the burial. The tomb of Djer is associated with the burials of 338 individuals. The people and animals sacrificed, such as donkeys, were expected to assist the pharaoh in the afterlife. For unknown reasons, this practice ended with the conclusion of the dynasty.

== Anthropological data and cultural affinities ==
A study on First Dynasty crania from the royal tombs in Abydos generally demonstrated greater affinity with Kerma Kushites, and Upper Nile Valley groups. Keita noted the predominant pattern was "Southern" or a "tropical African variant" (though others were also observed), which had affinities with Kerma Kushites. Moreover, the analysis too found clear change from earlier craniometric trends, as "lower Egyptian, Maghrebian, and European patterns are observed also, thus making for great diversity". The gene flow and movement of northern officials to the important southern city may explain the findings.

Archaeologist Bruce Williams has advanced the view that Nubian elites participated with their first dynastic counterparts in the development of the pharaonic civilization. Williams also clarified in 1987 that his discovery of the Qutsul incense burner proposed no claim of a Nubian origin or genesis for the pharaonic monarchy but that excavations had shown Nubian linkages and contributions. He maintained that detailed, archaeological evidence had found cemeteries of tombs situated in Qustul, Nubia which were described to be vastly wealthier and greater in size than the Abydos tombs of the first dynastic rulers.

According to American historian and linguist, Christopher Ehret, the ritual practice of retainer sacrifice found in the first dynastic royal tombs of Abydos originated from the southern region in the Middle Nile. Ehret also stated that this cultural practice was shared with the Kerma kingdom of the Upper Nubian Nile region.

== Rulers ==
Known rulers in the history of Egypt for the First Dynasty are as follows:

Name	Image	Comments	Start of Reign	Length of Reign	Family
Narmer/ Menes		Believed to be the same person as Menes and to have unified Upper and Lower Egypt. Possibly married Neithhotep.	c. 3273–2987 BC		Married with Neithotep, and father of Hor-Aha
Hor-Aha		Greek form: Athotís. Led an expedition against the Nubians. Married Benerib and Khenthap.	c. 3100 BC		Son of Narmer and Neithotep, spouse of Khenthap, Benerib, and father of Djer.
Djer		Greek form: Uenéphes (after his Gold name In-nebw); His name and titulary appear on the Palermo Stone. His tomb was later thought to be the legendary tomb of Osiris.	c. 3000 BC	54 years	Son of Hor-Aha, and father of Djet and Merneith.
Djet		Greek form: Usapháis. Possibly married Ahaneith.	c. 2980 BC	10 years	Spouse of Merneith, and father of Den
Den		Greek form: Kénkenes (after the ramesside diction of his birthname: Qenqen). First pharaoh depicted wearing the double crown of Egypt, first pharaoh with a full niswt bity-name.	c. 2970 BC	42 years	Son of Merneith and Djet.
Merneith		Possibly first female Pharaoh (or ruled as regent to her son Den or ruled as both king/queen and regent). Merneith was buried close to Djet and Den. Her tomb is of the same scale as the tombs of the (other) kings of that period.	c. 2950 BC		Mother of Den.
Anedjib		Greek form: Miebidós. Known for his ominous nebwy-title.	c. 2930 BC	8–10 years	Son of Den and Seshemetka .
Semerkhet		Greek form: Semempsés. First Egyptian ruler with a fully developed Nebty name. His complete reign is preserved on the Cairo stone.	c. 2920 BC	8 1/2 years	Son of Anedjib and Betrest.
Qa'a		Greek form: Bienéches. Ruled a long time, his tomb is the last one with subsidiary tombs.	c. 2910 BC	33 years	Son of Semerkhet, and father of Hotepsekhemwy.
Sneferka		Very short reign, correct chronological position unknown.	c. 2900 BC		
Horus Bird		Very short reign, correct chronological position unknown.	c. 2900 BC		

== Comparison of regnal lists ==
The surviving ancient king lists like Turin, Abydos and Saqqara, all from the New Kingdom of Egypt, provide a list of kings of this dynasty and are in broad agreement on the order of the kings in this dynasty.

Historical Pharaoh	Abydos King List	Turin King List	Manetho
Narmer	Meni	Meni	Menes
Aha	Teti	Teti	Athotís
Djer	Iti	Iti	Kénkenes
Djet	Ita	Itui	Uenéphes
Den	Septi	Qenti	Usapháis
Anedjib	Meribiap	Meribiapen	Miebidós
Semerkhet	Semsu	Semsen	Semempsés
Qa'a	Qebeh	Qebeh	Bienéches

== See also ==
- Dynasties of ancient Egypt
- Early Dynastic Period (Egypt)
- Predynastic Egypt
- First Dynasty of Egypt family tree

Preceded by Dynasty 0	Dynasty of Egypt c. 3100 – 2890 BC	Succeeded by Second Dynasty
