= Anedjib =

Egyptian pharaoh

- Anezib, Adjib, Azib, Miebîdós
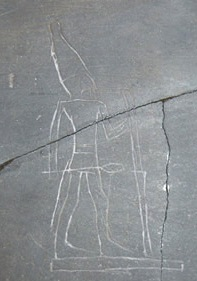
- Pharaoh Anedjib on a stone bowl fragment

Pharaoh
- Reign: 8-10 years, ca. 2930 BC
- Predecessor: Den
- Successor: Semerkhet
Royal titulary
Horus name
Hor-Adjib
Ḥr-ˁḏ-jb
He with the bold heart/force of will for Horus
G5	V26 F34
Prenomen
Nisut-Bity-Nebuy-Merybiap
nsw.t-bty-nebwy-mrj-bj3-p
King of Upper and Lower Egypt, he of the two lords,
the beloved one of the brazen throne
M23 t L2 t G7 G7 U6 N42 p
Abydos King List
Merybiap
mr-bj3-p
Beloved one of the brazen throne
< U7 r N42 p >
Saqqara Tablet
Merybiapen
mr.ij-bj3-pn
Beloved one of the brazen throne
< U7 r Z4 N42 p n >
Turin King List
Merygeregipen
mrj-grg-ipn
Beloved founder of the (brazen) throne
< U7 r U17 p n > G7
- Consort: Betrest ?
- Children: Semerkhet?
- Father: Den ?
- Burial: Tomb X, Umm el-Qa'ab
- Dynasty: 1st Dynasty

Anedjib, more correctly Adjib and also known as Hor-Anedjib, Hor-Adjib, Anezib and Azib, is the Horus name of an early Egyptian king who ruled during the 1st Dynasty.

The Egyptian historian Manetho named him "Miebîdós" and credited him with a reign of 26 years, whilst the Royal Canon of Turin credited him with an implausible reign of 74 years, though this may be his lifespan. Egyptologists and historians now consider both records to be exaggerations and generally credit Adjib with a reign of 8–10 years.

== Name sources ==
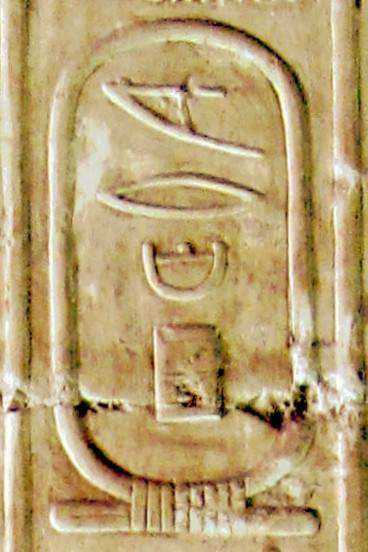
Cartouche name Merybiap from the Abydos King List

Adjib is well attested in archaeological records. His name appears in inscriptions on vessels made of schist, alabaster, breccia and marble. His name is also preserved on ivory tags and earthen jar seals. Objects bearing Adjib's name and titles come from Abydos and Sakkara.

== Family ==
Adjib's family has only partially been investigated. His parents are unknown, but it is thought that his predecessor, king Den, may have been his father. Adjib was possibly married to a woman named Betrest. On the Palermo Stone she is described as the mother of Adjib's successor, king Semerkhet. Definite evidence for that view has not yet been found. It would be expected that Adjib had sons and daughters, but their names have not been preserved in the historical record. A candidate for being a possible member of his family line is Semerkhet.

== Reign ==
According to archaeological records, Adjib introduced a new royal title which he thought to use as some kind of complement to the Nisut-Bity-title: the Nebuy-title, written with the doubled sign of a falcon on a short standard. It means "The two lords" and refers to the divine state patrons Horus and Set. It also symbolically points to Lower and Upper Egypt. Adjib is thought to have legitimised his role as king with the use of this title. According to vessel fragments, Anedjib used the throne name Mr-by'-pw (Merybiap).

Clay seal impressions record the foundation of the new royal fortress Hor nebw-khet ("Horus, the gold of the divine community") and the royal residence Hor seba-khet ("Horus, the star of the divine community"). Stone vessel inscriptions show that during Adjib's reign an unusually large number of cult statues were made for the king. At least six objects show the depicting of standing statues representing the king with his royal insignia.

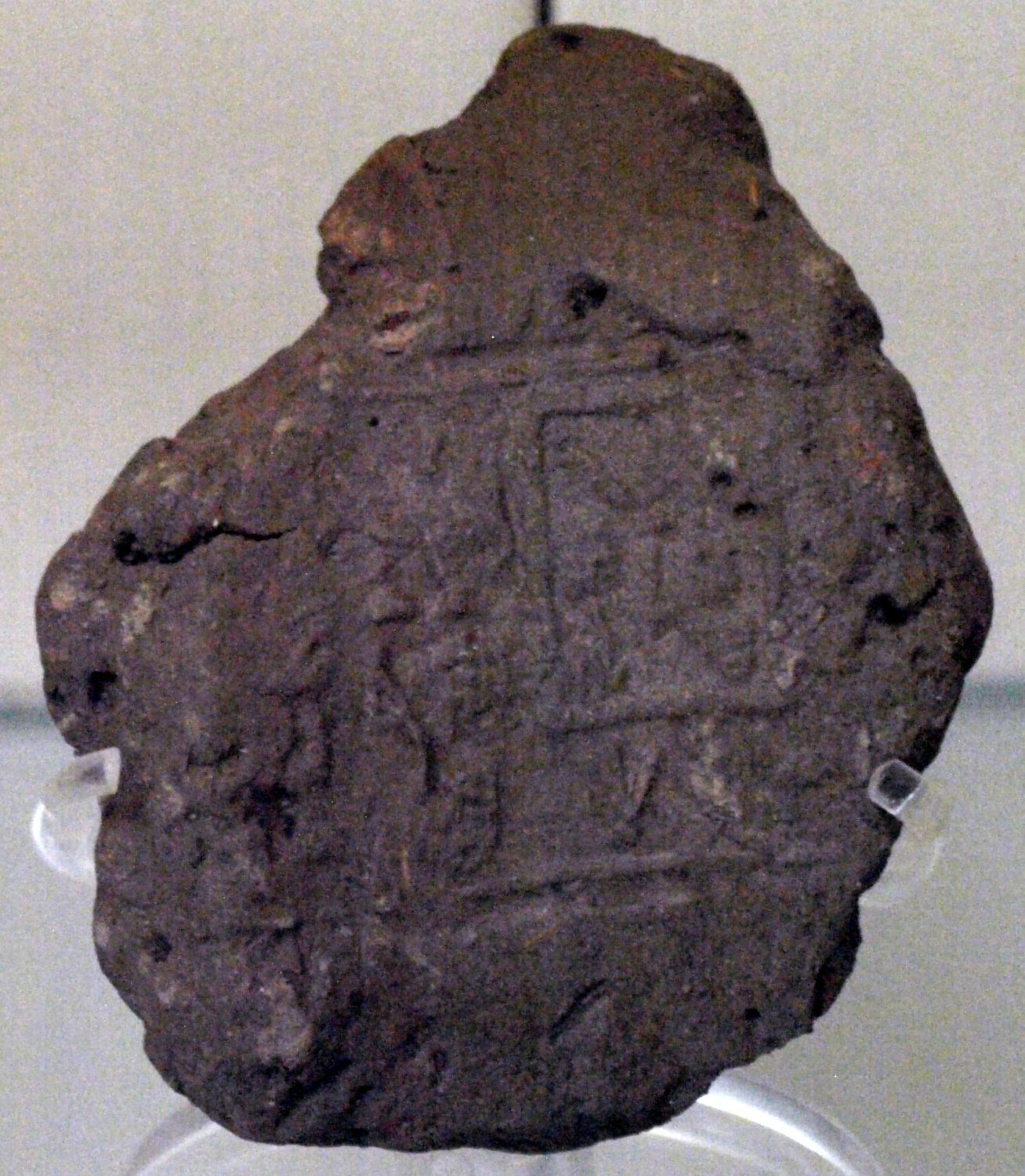
Seal impression of king Anedjib now in the British Museum(EA 65906).

Stone vessel inscriptions record that Adjib commemorated a first and even a second Heb Sed (a throne jubilee), a feast that was celebrated the first time after 30 years of a king's reign, after which it was repeated every third or fourth year. Initially, it was thought that Adjib had perhaps co-ruled with his father and/or succeeded at a late age, in order to account for these implausible Sed festivals. But recent investigations suggest that every object showing the Hebsed and Adjib's name together were removed from king Den's tomb. It would seem that Adjib had simply erased and replaced Den's name with his own. This is seen by egyptologists and historians as evidence that Adjib never celebrated a Hebsed and thus his reign was relatively short. Egyptologists such as Nicolas Grimal and Wolfgang Helck assume that Adjib, as Den's son and rightful heir to the throne, may have been quite old when he ascended the Egyptian throne. Helck additionally points to an unusual feature; All Hebsed pictures of Adjib show the notation Qesen ("calamity") written on the stairways of the Hebsed pavilion. Possibly the end of Adjib's reign was a violent one.

== Tomb ==
Adjib's burial site was excavated at the Umm el-Qa'ab necropolis in Abydos and is known as "Tomb X". It measures 16.4 x 9.0 metres and is the smallest of all royal tombs in this area. Adjib's burial chamber (7 x 4.5 metres), consists of two rooms and is accessed by a stairway from the east. The walls of the chamber are more than a meter thick, and the rooms are divided by a cut-off wall. The smaller of the two chambers contained several cylinder seals and was probably a storage chamber. The burial chamber was made of wooden planks set in the desert sand without any other foundations. Some of these planks were well-preserved. The roof of the chamber was held up by wooden posts, one of which was found still intact by the excavators.

The main chamber is surrounded by 64 subsidiary tombs which are interpreted as ancillary burials. Some of these chambers contained large numbers of ivory carvings. Until the end of the 1st dynasty, it would seem to have been a tradition that the family and court of the king committed suicide (or were killed) and were then buried alongside the ruler in his necropolis.

To date, the tomb has only been excavated once, by Flinders Petrie between 1899 and 1900. This is unlike the other tombs in the necropolis, which were excavated before Petrie by the Frenchman Émile Amélineau and subsequently by the German Archaeological Institute.

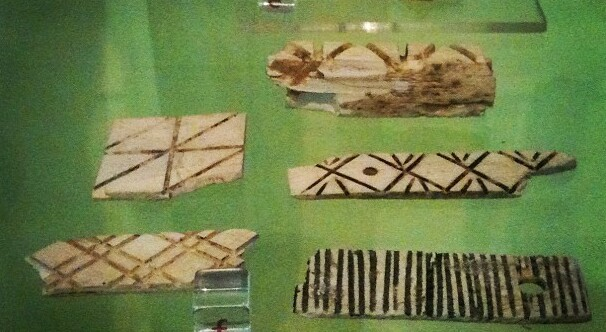
Ivory inlay carvings from the tomb

== Finds associated to Anedjib ==
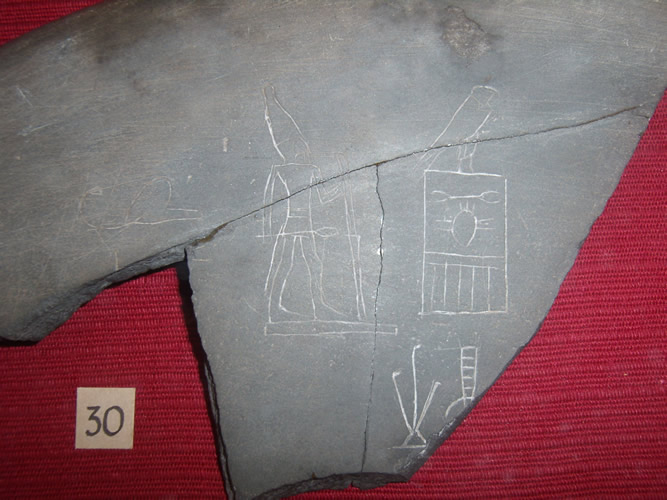
Stone vessel fragment bearing Anedjib serekh.

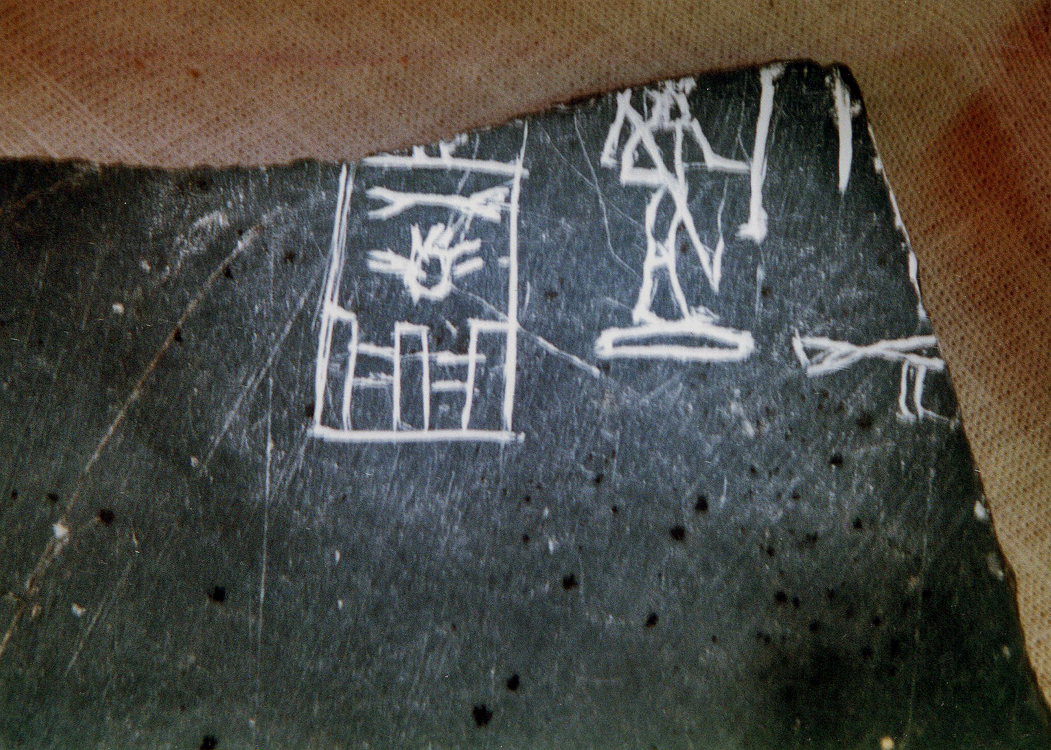
Serekh of Anedjib from an inscription.

Map of Anedjib's tomb in the Umm el-Qa'ab.

== Bibliography ==
- Eva-Maria Engel. "The Royal Tombs at Umm el-Qa'ab," In: Archeo-Nil 18 (2008), p. 39.
- William Matthew Flinders Petrie. The royal tombs of the first dynasty: 1900. Part I (= Memoir of the Egypt Exploration Fund. Volume 18, ISSN 0307-5109). Egypt Exploration Fund, London 1900, Digitised, pp. 12–13.

Preceded by Den	Pharaoh of Egypt	Succeeded by Semerkhet
