= Betrest =

Ancient Egyptian queen

Betrest in hieroglyphs
b t E11 ti r s t B1
Batiires
Bꜣ.ti ir.s
May Bata be favorably disposed toward her
- Mother of Pharaoh Semerkhet

Betrest (also read as Batyires, and Batires) was a queen of Ancient Egypt. She lived during the First Dynasty.

== Name ==
Flinders Petrie may have considered the first two glyphs as part of a title, and reads the name on the Cairo stone fragment as Tarset. Henri Gauthier reads Tef-ti-iriset, I.E.S. Edwards and Toby Wilkinson read Bat-iry-set. Today her name is commonly read as, Betrest or Batyires. According to Silke Roth the Name Batyires means "may Bata be favorably disposed toward her". She thinks that the queen's name was connected to the ancestor-deity Bata (also read as Baty). Toby Wilkinson instead translates the name with "motherhood is her companion" and points to the possible position of the queen as a mother of a king who followed her husband, King Den or Anedjib.

== Identity ==
Betrest is said to have been the mother of Semerkhet. Her name appears in Line III on the Cairo stone fragment C1, where she bears the title Mut (meaning "mother"). The identity of her husband is disputed. Some consider King Den to have been her husband. If so, King Anedjib would have been a (half-)brother of King Semerkhet. Another theory is that Betrest was the wife of the short-ruled Anedjib.

Possibly, she also is identified on a stela found at Abydos. The name of the person on the stela included a ram-hieroglyph (which commonly reads "Ba") and the signs "s" and "t" are visible. If this monument belongs to Queen Betrest, then it also preserves part of a title with a Horus-falcon sign, which may be part of the She Who Sees Horus title, which is a common title for royal queens in the Old Kingdom of ancient Egypt. Silke Roth and Toby Wilkinson point out, however, that the ram-hieroglyph was read differently in early times. The reading as "Ba" (meaning "soul"), does not appear before the Old Kingdom period and during the two first dynasties the ram-sign was read as, Khnemu (for the deity Khnum) or Ser (meaning "sheep", "ram", or "begetter"). This reading is promoted by the hieroglyph for "s" on the stela. In sum the reading on the stela had to be Seret, which means "mother sheep" or "she of the ram". It seems that the later ramesside scribes, who compiled the Annal stone (and therefore the Cairo stone inscription), had no knowledge of the older readings for the ram sign and simply read "Ba", changing Seret into Batyires.

== Tomb ==
If the lady Betrest is the same person as the lady Seret of the first dynasty stela, then Betrest was buried in the necropolis of King Den at Abydos. Her tomb comprises a chamber that is structurally nestled into the entrance of Den's own funerary chamber and therefore, is subsidiary to his burial. There are two chambers fitting this description, one on the left side of the entrance and the other on the right. The two chambers differ in size but both are visibly larger than the ordinary subsidiary tombs of retainers. This peculiarity points to the privileged status that Betrest/Seret must have enjoyed during this king's reign. Indeed, only queens and royal mothers were allowed to be buried so close to the king. It is not recorded in which of the two chambers the stela was found.
