= Prenomen (Ancient Egypt) =

Ancient Egyptian regnal name

"dual king" in hieroglyphs
M23 X1 L2 X1
nswt-bjtj
"[He] of the Sedge and the Bee"
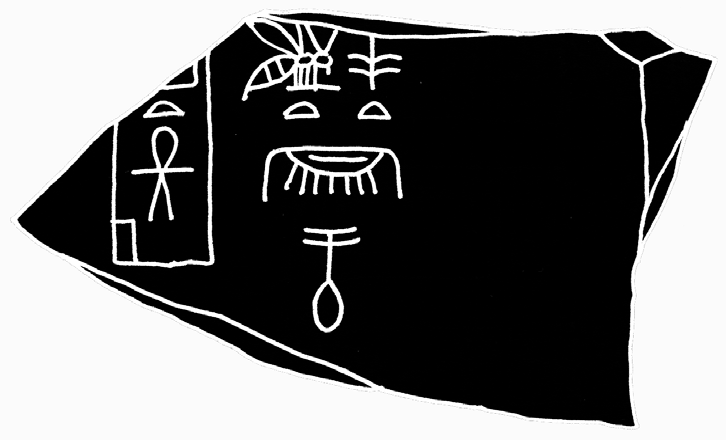
- Early example of the nswt-bjtj crest: Pharaoh Nubnefer, Second Dynasty.

The prenomen, also called cartouche name or throne name (Ancient Egyptian: 𓆥 nswt-bjtj "of the Sedge and Bee") of ancient Egypt, was one of the five royal names of pharaohs. The first pharaoh to have a Sedge and Bee name was Den during the First Dynasty.

Most Egyptologists believe that the prenomen was a regnal name.

The first part of the title, ni-su, seems to have referred to the eternal institution of kingship itself. It was, in fact, the word for "king" in expressions[.] The word bjt, on the other hand, more properly referred to the ephemeral holder of the position. In this way, both the divine and the mortal were referenced in the phrase, along with the obvious dual division of the northern and southern lands. For these reasons, the translation "Dual King" is preferred today.

Others think that it originally represented the birth name of the rulers.

The term "of the Sedge and Bee" is written by the hieroglyphs representing a sedge, representing Upper Egypt (𓇓 Gardiner M23) and a bee, representing Lower Egypt (𓆤 L2), each combined with the feminine ending t (𓏏 X1), read as nsw.t and bj.t respectively; The adjectival nisba ending -j is not represented in writing.

During the first three dynasties, the prenomen was depicted either alone or in pair with the Nebty name. Semerkhet was the first pharaoh who devoted his prenomen to the Two Ladies. From Pharaoh Huni, the probable last king of the Third Dynasty onward, the prenomen was encircled by the cartouche (the elongated form of the shen ring).

For most of history of Egypt, the title was written in a male form, regardless of the ruling pharaoh's gender. A feminized version - nsjt bjtjt - is attested only for the last female Pharaoh, Cleopatra VII.

== Title ==
The nswt-bjtj title is recorded from the time of the First Dynasty. It is conventionally paraphrased as "Dual King" or "King of Upper and Lower Egypt", but its literal interpretation would be "[He of] sedge [and] bee". The t hieroglyph (X1) is archaically read as tj, so that in Old Egyptian the transliteration of the title would be nsw.tj-bj.tj.

The spelling sw.t.n in the Old Kingdom was initially interpreted as representing swtn or stn (now deprecated). Kurt Sethe later proposed the interpretation of n-swtj as "belonging to the Sut-plant". The prepositional n is omitted in the spelling sw.tj. The term nswt is used in reference to the king, but not as a title placed before a royal name. A rare variant form spells nswt as nzw.

In the Amarna Period, an Akkadian cuneiform transliteration of the title is recorded, as in-si-bi-ya, representing a Late Egyptian pronunciation of approximately [ɪnsəˈβiːjaʔ]. Schenkel (1986) cites a reconstruction of an older Egyptian form, based on the cuneiform, as *jinsiw-bījVt, where V is an unknown vowel. This would seem to cast doubt on the widespread reading of n(j)-sw.t bj.tj, because a t in this position is preserved in Coptic, and would not have been omitted in cuneiform. Schenkel and Peust (2007) have also questioned the derivation of nswt from swt "sedge", considering the swt-graph to be a borrowed sound rather than the emblem of Upper Egypt. In this case, nsw(t)-bjt(j) would simply be a combination of two words meaning "king".

Kahl (2008) attempts a symbolological interpretation of the "sedge" and the "bee" as representing Upper and Lower Egypt, respectively. According to Kahl, the "seal of the sprouting reed", reveals a "rather maternal and protecting function" of the king, and the "seal of the defensive bee" represents "a rather power and strength seeking character". The earliest instances of the use of bjt date back to the time period corresponding to queen Merneith's possible rule, between the reigns of Djet and Den in the mid First Dynasty.

Honey was used in Ancient Egypt as food, medicine, table offering in temples and shrines and as an important trade ware. Additionally, the bee sign might have had the meaning of "wealth, affluence". This might explain why the bjtj crest is used when describing offices that were responsible for economic duties such as the Khetemty-bity for "seal bearer of the bjtj-king". A military interpretation, depicting the bee in reference to its sting, has also been proposed. The strongest evidence supporting this conclusion comes from the pyramid texts of king Unas and Teti of the late Fifth and early Sixth Dynasty. In these texts, the goddess Nut is described as a "swarm of bees, encircling and devouring the king's enemy".

== Use ==
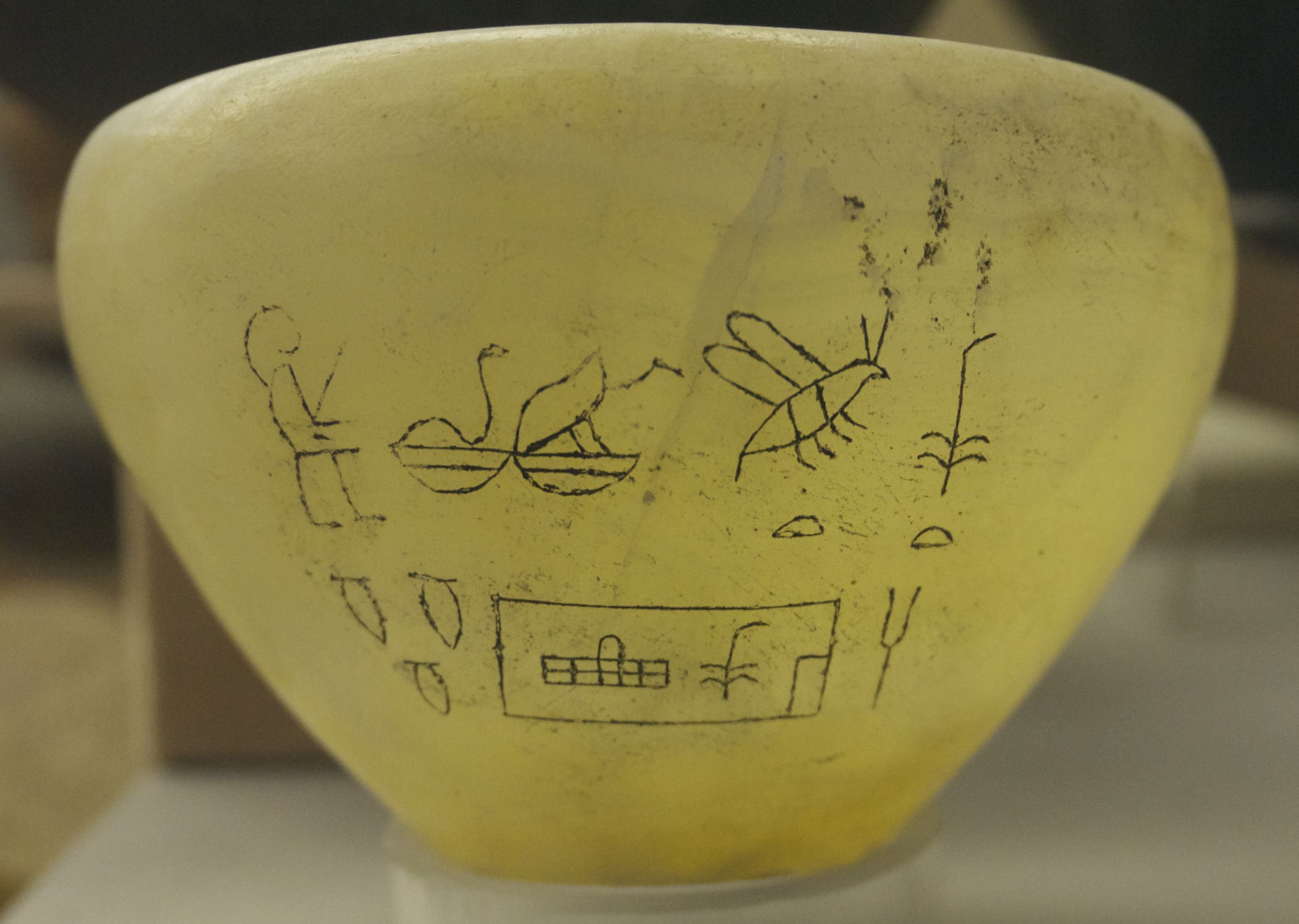
Nswt-bjtj crest combined with the nbtj crest (top row; here: king Semerkhet of 1st dynasty).

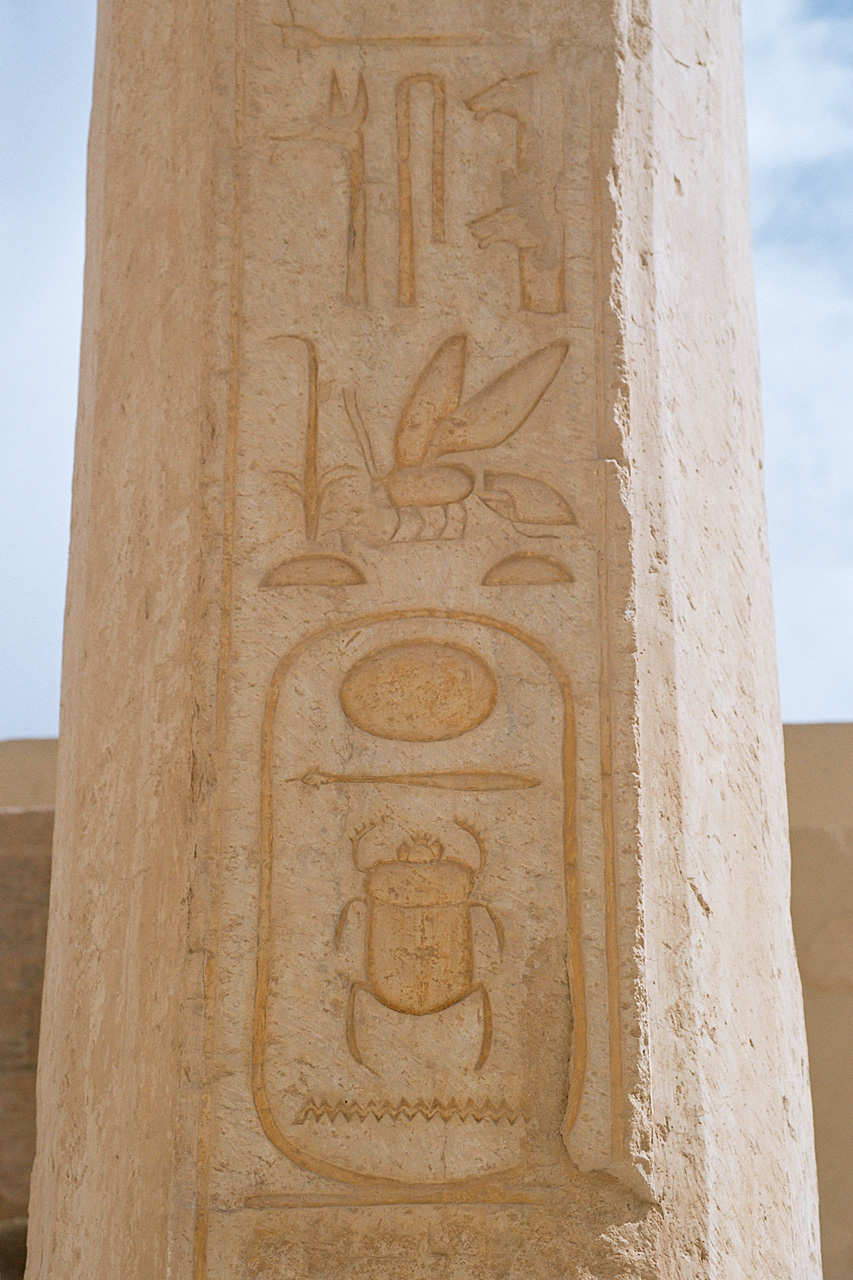
Later example of the nswt-bjtj crest, here introducing a cartouche name (Thutmose II)

Three different uses for the nswt-bjtj group of signs are known. First, they represented the highest level of command, for the king himself as well for his subjects. Thus, every title of an official containing the nswt- or bjt signs gave the holder the highest executive authority. Examples of such titles are sḏꜣwtj-bjtj and sḏꜣwtj-nswt. Despite using the bjt and nswt group of signs, both titles actually mean "sealbearer of the king". However, when used separately and in mere economic contexts, the titles could have a more specific meaning, for example sḏꜣwtj-bjtj can be read as "sealbearer of the king of Lower Egypt" and sḏꜣwtj-nswt as "seal bearer of the king of Upper Egypt". A unique case seems to be the birth name of the Third Dynasty king Huni: his name contains the nswt crest beside the signs for ḥw meaning "utterance" or "appointment" or ḥwj for "smiting" or "beating".

Secondly, both sign groups could be used either alone or together to designate the personal property of the pharaoh or an order of him. The former usage is similar to that of the hieroglyph of the sitting falcon while an example of the latter is found in a rock inscription in Sinai dating to the Second Dynasty. The inscription, which names the "administrator of the desert and general Ankhenity", further reads wpwt nswt meaning "[commissioned] by order of the nswt king". A similar factum is found in words describing royal actions. The word wḏ nswt, for example, means "royal decree".

A third symbolic and also practical meaning of nswt lies in its use to express and accentuate relationships in the royal family. Originally the nswt crest expressed a direct blood link with the pharaoh, for example in the titles sꜣ-nswt for "son of the king" and mwt-nswt for "mother of the king". At some point during the Fifth Dynasty however, the titles for son or daughter of the king became honorific and were given to high officials and courtiers alike. Indirect kinships and mere acquaintances with the king were expressed with titles such as smr-nswt meaning "friend/courtier of the king" and rḫ-nswt for "favorite of the king". This kind of expression dates back to the First Dynasty, with the titles mry nsw, "beloved of the king", and ꜥnḫ-mrr-nsw, "living for and beloved by the king", appearing during the reign of Djet. Both titles are rare and might point to elite positions held by the title bearers.

Finally, similarly to the nswt crest, the bjt crest also expressed royal authority. For example, a "seal-bearer of the bjt-king" was - alongside the direct relatives of the king - the only one allowed to touch, count and seal the personal possessions of the pharaoh.

When used singly or combined with other symbols, nswt and bjt received advanced meanings in Egyptian heraldry, especially when connected with administrative and/or economic institutions. The sign group pr-nswt, for example, meaning "house of the king", represented the royal household and/or the palace of the king.

Semerkhet, the seventh ruler of the First Dynasty, introduced the famous Nebty name as a complementary counterpart to the nswt-bjtj crest. Semerkhet's predecessor, Anedjib, had introduced the nbwj name as a heraldic emendation. But nbwj (meaning "the two lords") seemed to include the wrong gender. Semerkhet seemed to seek for a "female" crest and thus changed the nbwj name into the nbtj name, the crest of the "Two Ladies" (Nekhbet and Wadjet). From Semerkhet to Nynetjer (the third ruler of the Second Dynasty), the nswt-bjtj crest appeared in pair with the Nebty name. Seth-Peribsen (possibly Nynetjer's direct successor) was the first to separate the crests and use the nswt-bjtj crest alone again. He used the nbtj crest separately, too, but peculiarly, the name "Peribsen" was used in all crests.

== Introduction and history ==
The final form of the title nswt-bjtj was introduced during the reign of king Horus Den, the fifth ruler of the First Dynasty, and was then adopted by all subsequent kings. At the time of the introduction of the nswt-bjtj crest both groups were already in use separately. The single sign group nsw.t was already in use under king Djer, the third king of the dynasty and maybe even under king Hor-Aha, his predecessor. The sign group bj.t appeared slightly later, during the reign of Den. An interesting background is the symbolic implementation of nswt with the White Crown of Upper Egypt and bjt with the Red Crown of Lower Egypt.

King Djedefre, the third ruler of the Fourth Dynasty, combined the nswt-bjtj crest for the first time with the title Sa-Rē (Egyptian: zȝ-rˁ "son of Rē"). This title followed the cartouche as an emendation of the birth name. King Neferirkare Kakai, the third ruler of the Fifth Dynasty, was the first who separated the nswt-bjtj- and the sa-rê crest and turned them into two different, independent names: nomen and prenomen. Now the title sa-rê introduced the new name and it was also placed in a cartouche. During later times, pharaohs often used both names, prenomen and nomen, in cartouches, which sometimes led to confusion amongst Egyptologists in the past. The reason for the confusion was differences between the royal names presented by the ancient historian Manetho and the Ramesside king lists, such as the Abydos King List, the Saqqara Table and the Turin Canon. Whilst Manetho referred to the nomen, the Ramesside king lists used the prenomen. Another reason is that many rulers of later periods used the cartouche versions of their nomen and prenomen separately in different inscriptions. Only in inscriptions that depict both names side by side is it obvious that the two names belong to the same king.

The title was used in the same - male - form, even in cases when ruling pharaoh was a woman. The only instance of a feminized version is known from the reign of Cleopatra VII for whom there is attested form nsjt-n-tꜣ-šmꜥ bjtjt-n-tꜣ-mḥw that contains female versions of both nswt and bitj, as well as references to Upper and Lower Egypt, and can be translated as "Queen of Upper and Lower Egypt", or - more detailedly - "Queen of the land of Upper Egypt (and) Queen of the land of Lower Egypt".
