= Umm El Qa'ab =

Ancient Egyptian necropolis

- أم القعاب (Arabic)
- Location within Egypt
- 26°10.5′N 31°54.5′E
- Location: Egypt
- Region: New Valley Governorate

Site notes
- Excavation dates: 1895-1898, 1900-1901, 1908-1912, 1977-present
- Archaeologists: Émile Amélineau, Flinders Petrie, Édouard Naville, T. Eric Peet, W. Kaiser, G. Dreyer

Umm El Qaʻāb (also Umm el-Qaab, Umm al-Qaab, or Umm El Gaʻab; Arabic: أم القعاب) is an archaeological site located at Abydos, Egypt. Its modern name, meaning "Mother of Pots", refers to the mound made of millions of broken pieces of pots which defines the landscape. Umm el Qa'ab contains evidence that the site is the cemetery for Egypt's predynastic proto-kings along with rulers of the 1st and 2nd dynasties. In addition to early royal tombs, evidence also suggests a later link between the site, the cult of Osiris, and Osiris' annual festival. It is located 1,5 kilometers to the west of Temple of Seti I at Abydos. The main temple to the god Khenti-Amentiu lies one mile to the south.

The cemetery was likely founded during the Naqada I period (4,000 BCE) as evident from the tomb structures, pottery, and seal impressions excavated from the site. The location continued as a royal cemetery through the First Dynasty (2,950-2,775 BCE) and ended with the burial of only the last two kings of the Second Dynasty, Peribsen and Khasekhemy (2,650 BCE).

Development of Umm El Gaʻab necropolis occurred in three stages, moving from north to south:

- Cemetery U – Pre-Dynastic
- Cemetery B – royal tombs of Dynasty 0 and early Dynasty I
- Tomb complexes – six kings and one queen of Dynasty I, and two kings of Dynasty II

The Pre and Early dynastic royal cemetery at Umm el-Qa'ab became a site of veneration and cultic practice beginning in the Middle Kingdom (1,938 BCE) and stayed in use for 1,500 years until the Ptolemaic Dynasty (305-30 BCE).

== Archaeology ==
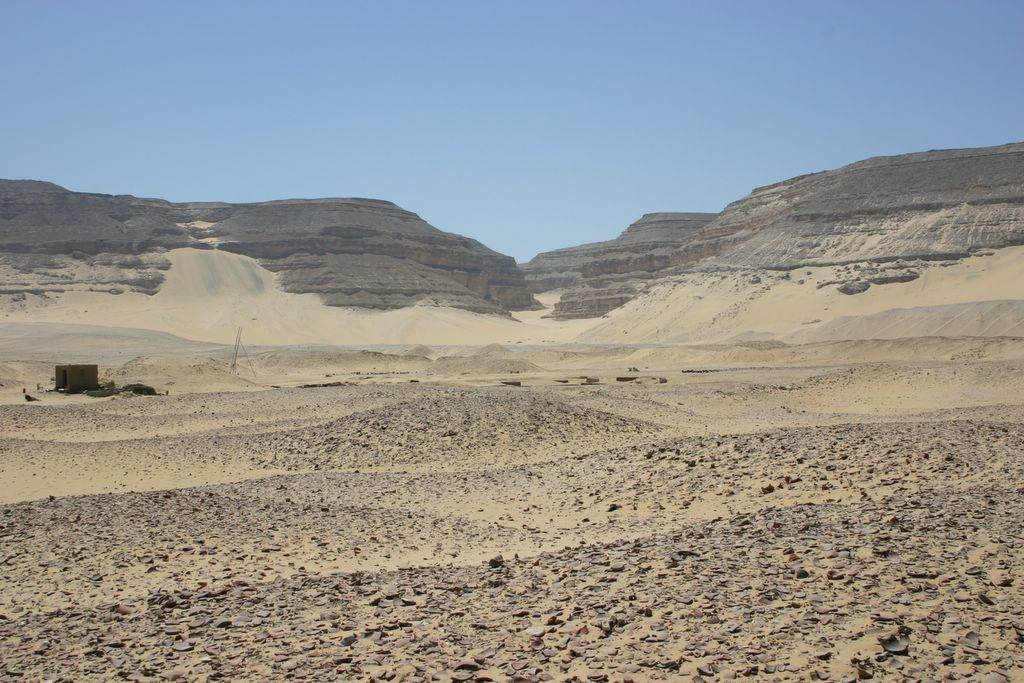
Umm El Gaʻab – General view of area, showing littering of pots

The tombs of this area were first excavated by Émile Amélineau between 1895 and 1898.

The site was then excavated by Flinders Petrie in 1900 and 1901 under the auspices of the Egypt Exploration Society. His work was continued on a small scale by T. Eric Peet and Édouard Naville between 1908 and 1912.

In 1977 a German Archaeological Institute team led by W. Kaiser and G. Dreyer resumed work at the site.

In 1990s 16 wood samples (from wooden roofs, coffins, and mattings) were radiocarbon dated. The relative chronology of the radiocarbon dates was in line with the standard view of period and ruler order, but the absolute date was more than 100 years older than the currently held historical chronology. Example results were Naqada IId – middle 35th century BC, Naqada IIIa2 – middle 34th century BC, and 2920-2910 BC for Qa'a, the last ruler of the 1st Dynasty.

== Pre-dynastic and Dynasty 0 tombs ==
=== Cemetery U ===
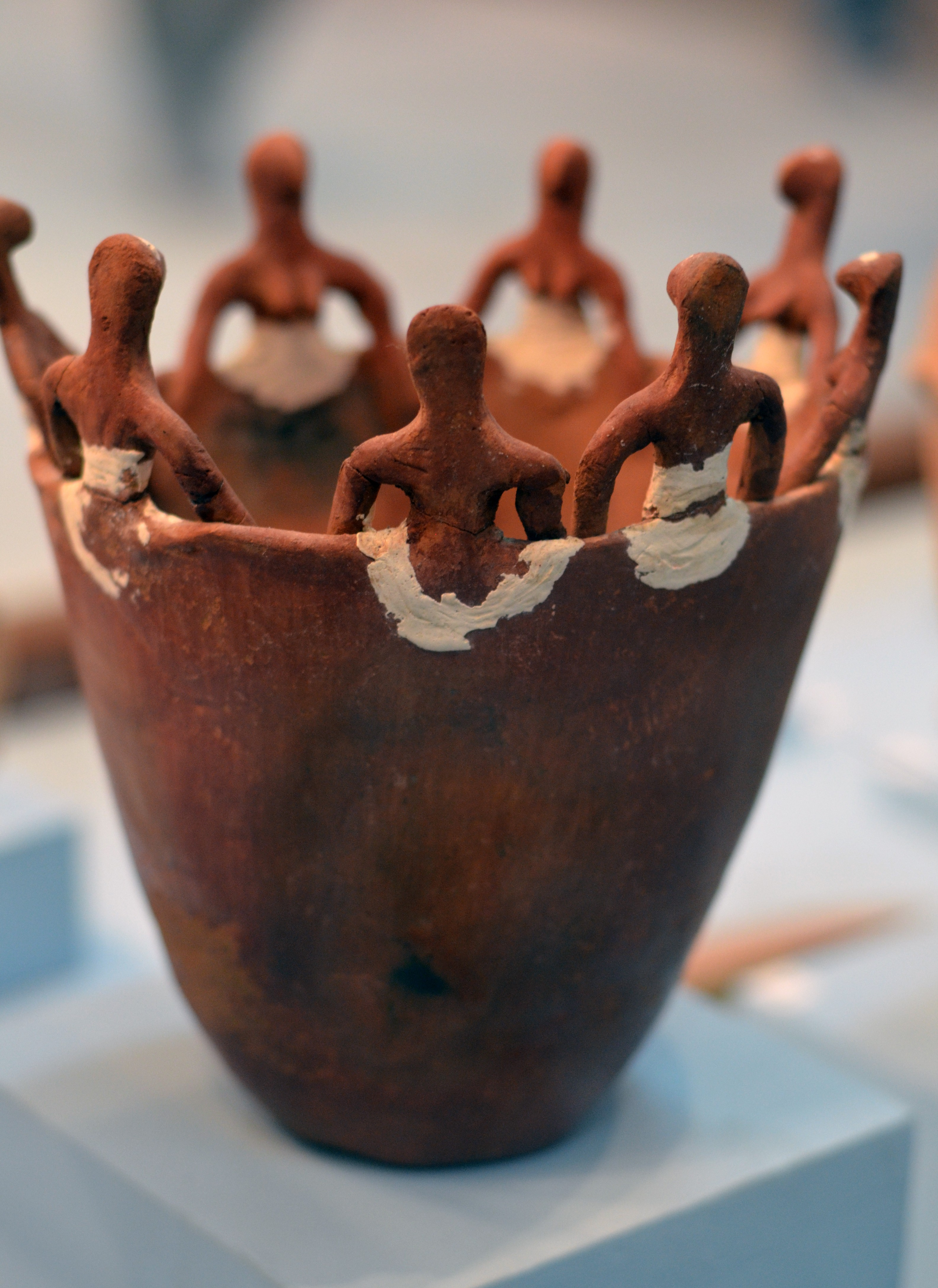
Vessel with "Dancing" Women. Predynastic Vessel. Late Naqada I, from the tomb U-502 at Umm El Qa'ab, Abydos (Cairo Museum, JE 99583)

Cemetery U is located at the northern edge of Umm el-Qa'ab and holds roughly 700 graves from the Naqada I–III period (c. 3700–3050 BC). Early on simple pit graves were used with increasing sophistication in Naqada IId period and then mudbrick line tombs with wooden beam roofs in Naqada III period. Inscriptions found in the tombs were interpreted by the excavator as evidence of it being the burial site of 17 Egyptian proto-kings of the Naqada III period. Another interpretation is that the signs actually represent places or gods. Tomb U-j contains the bulk of evidence which supports the royal nature of the site. Use of the area as a necropolis began, in an undifferentiated manner, in late Naqada I-IIa/b period. Then, after a period of non-use in the Naqada IIc period in Naqada IId larger tombs began to appear. Beginning in Naqada IIIa tomb construction became mudbrick lined and multi-chambered tombs began to appear.

=== Tomb U-j ===
The tomb was partially excavated by Émile Amélineau during his 1895-1898 efforts though this was not well documented. Sixteen vessels from that work were split between the Egyptian Museum in Cairo and the Louvre. Three more vessels in the British Museum are also thought to have that provenance. The tomb was then "discovered" by G. Dreyer in 1978 during his excavations at the site.

Dated to Naqada IIIA2 (3,300 BCE), tomb U-j is the largest tomb found at Cemetery U and contains 12 separate chambers. In contrast to the earlier Predynastic pit tombs found at Cemetery U, tomb U-j's multichambered design was outlined by mud-brick walls and had a roof made from wooden beams. The tomb was built in two stages with two brick (0.44 meters) exterior walls and 1.5 brick (0.35 meter) interior walls. The first construction measured north side - 10.1 meters, south side 10.3 meters, west side 5.2 meters, and east side 5.25 meters. Two more chambers (11 and 12) were then added, with somewhat poorer construction, to the south extending the west and east sides to 8.25 meters and 8 meters respectively. The northwest and largest room (Chamber 1) is thought to have been the burial chamber and remnants of a wooden shrine were found there as well as "Wavy-Handled vessels" thought to have held oil. About 700 imported Canaanite wine vessels were found (about 120 in Chamber 7, about 173 in Chamber 10, and about 400 in Chamber 12) stacked 4 rows deep. Each vessel was about 6 liters and sealing bullae made from local Nile mud. Small finds included a comb, two gold nails, small carnelian and turquoise beads, and "a large obsidian dish with a human hand carved in relief on its outer surface". Although the tomb had been subject to plundering, about 2000 ceramic vessels were recovered with nearly one third having been imported from Palestine. These ceramic vessels contained traces of tree-resin-infused wine, providing the first evidence of wine in Ancient Egypt. In addition to ceramic vessels, tomb U-j also contained bowls carved out of obsidian and chests made from imported cedar. The presence of these items suggests the existence of an extensive trade network during the time the tombs were being constructed.

It has been suggested that Tomb U-j might have been that of predynastic ruler Scorpion I or of the otherwise unattested predynastic ruler Bull.

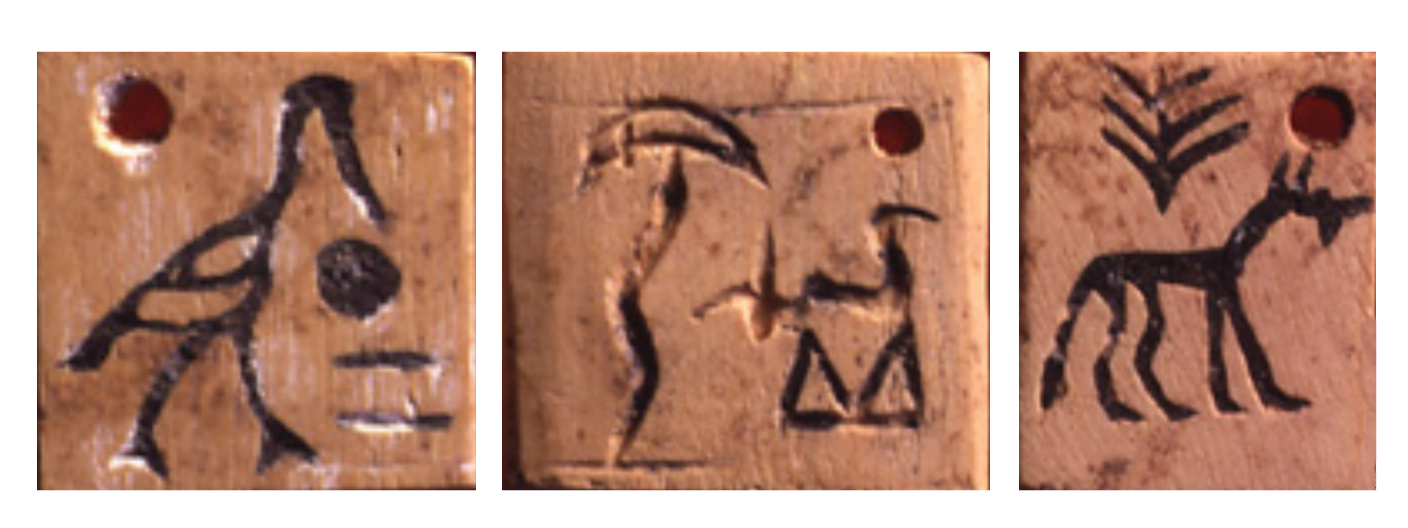
Ivory tags found at Cemetery U-j.

==== Proto-hieroglyphics ====
Small ivory hole pierced tags with "proto-hieroglyphic" characters inscribed on them, 186 in total, were also recovered from the tomb. These artifacts possibly provide the earliest evidence of writing in Egypt. Analysis of Tomb U-j has led some scholars to believe that the origins of social stratification within Ancient Egypt can be found among the artifacts and burial practices found at the site. It has been suggested that the ivory tags found in the tomb provide evidence for the existence of advanced administrative and bureaucratic organization. Very similar tags were with proto-cuneiform characters were found in Uruk III-IV period (c. 3300-3100 BC) context in Mesopotamia and these tags continued in use until at least the Ur III period (c. 2112-2004 BC). They were thought to be, in Mesopotamia, used to indicate the contents of baskets.

About 125 "Wavy-Handled vessels", about 30 centimeters high, and fragments (all found in Chamber 1 – the burial chamber) had one or two large (up to about ten centimeters high) characters inscribed on them in ink. Typical characters were trees, plants such as palm fronds, scorpions, and spider conchs. It is uncertain what the meaning or purpose of the inscribed characters was.

=== Cemetery B ===
- B1/B2: Iry-Hor
- B7/B9: Ka

== First Dynasty tombs ==
=== Cemetery B ===
Cemetery B is located south of Cemetery U and contains the tombs of Egypt's First Dynasty king along with the last two kings of the Second Dynasty. Furthermore, inscriptional evidence found at isolated tombs also suggests the Dynasty 0 rulers, Qa'a, Iry-Hor, and Narmer, were buried at this site. The royal tombs located at Cemetery B were significantly larger and more architecturally complex when compared to their predynastic predecessors at Cemetery U. For instance, the First Dynasty ruler, King Djer, had a burial chamber of nearly 96 sq. m, while the burial chamber at Tomb U-j was only 20 sq. m.

- B17/B18: Narmer
- B10/B15/B19: Aha
- O: Djer
- Z: Djet
- Y: Merneith
- T: Den
- X: Anedjib
- U: Semerkhet
- Q: Qa'a
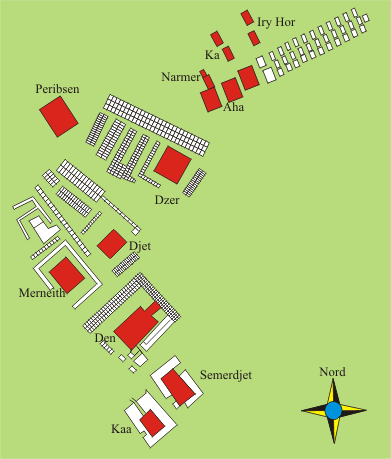
Tombs of the Egyptian 1st dynasty

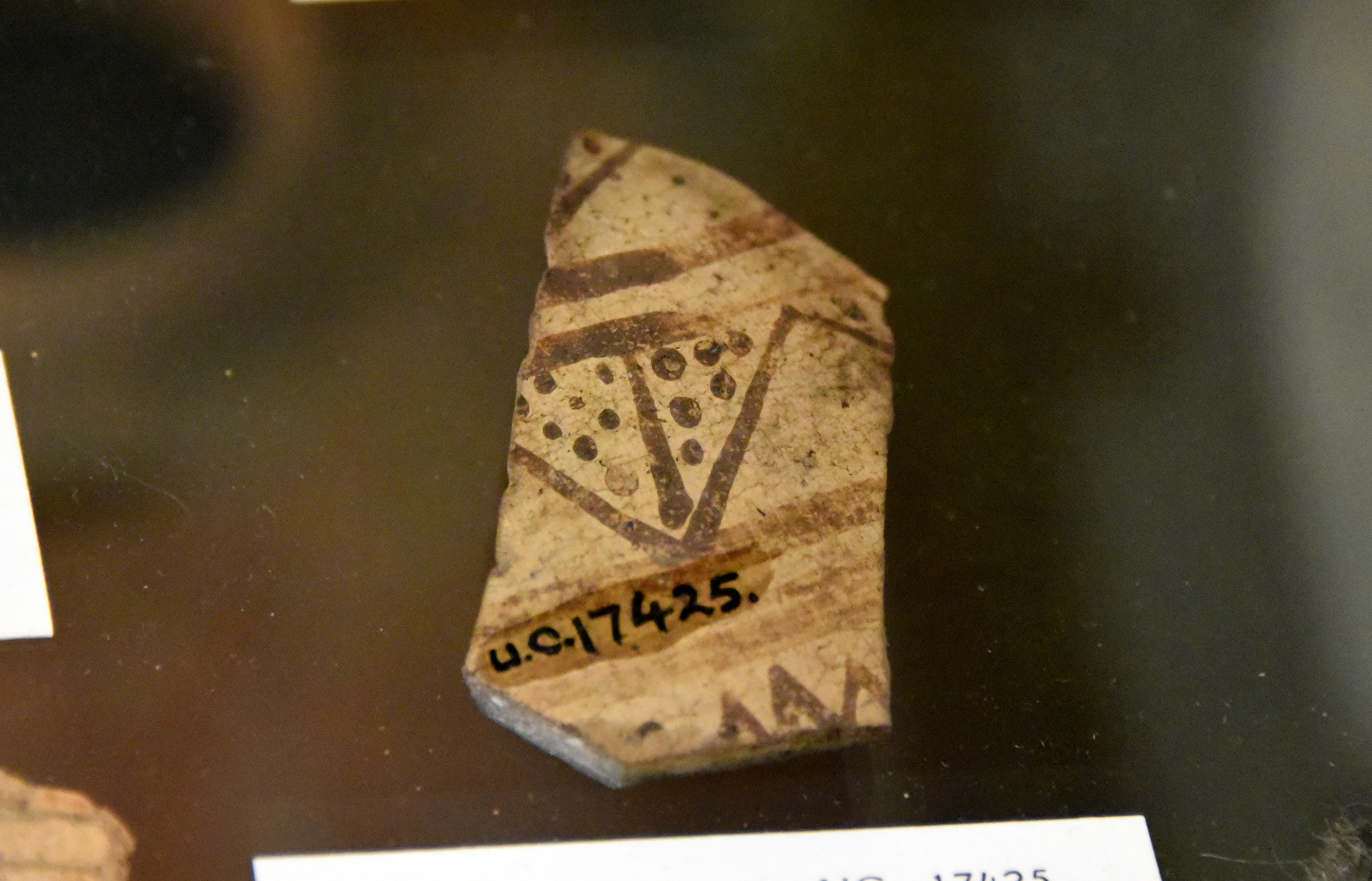
Pottery sherd, from stump base of a jug. 1st Dynasty. From the Royal Tomb of Semerkhet at Umm el-Qa'ab, Abydos, Egypt. Petrie Museum of Egyptian Archaeology, London

=== Human sacrifice and 1st Dynasty tombs ===
Human sacrifice was practiced as part of the funerary rituals associated with the First Dynasty. The tomb of Djer is associated with the burials of 338 individuals thought to have been sacrificed. The people and animals sacrificed, such as asses, were expected to assist the pharaoh in the afterlife. It appears that Djer's courtiers were strangled and their tombs all closed at the same time. For unknown reasons, this practice ended with the conclusion of the dynasty, with shabtis taking the place of actual people to aid the pharaohs with the work expected of them in the afterlife.

=== Tomb stelas ===
Many First and Second Dynasty pharaohs had tomb steles erected outside their tomb with their Serekh and their Horus name listed on it, which helps confirm the identity of the tomb owners. The following images shows the surviving tomb steles of pharaohs buried at Umm El Qa'ab.

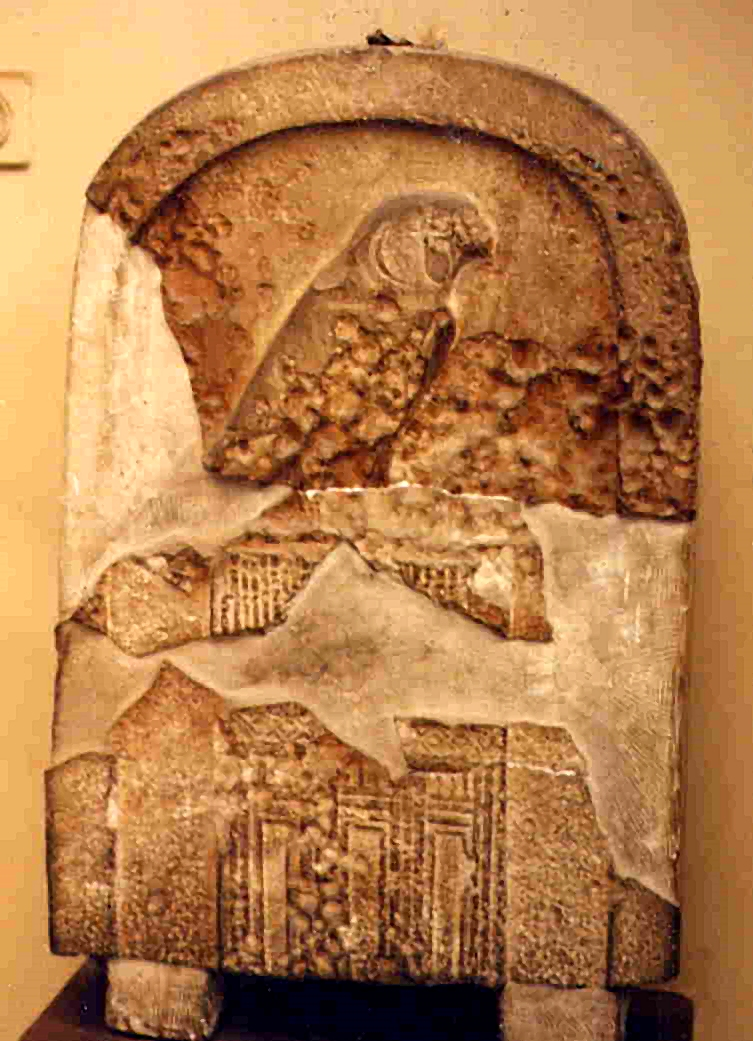
Djer

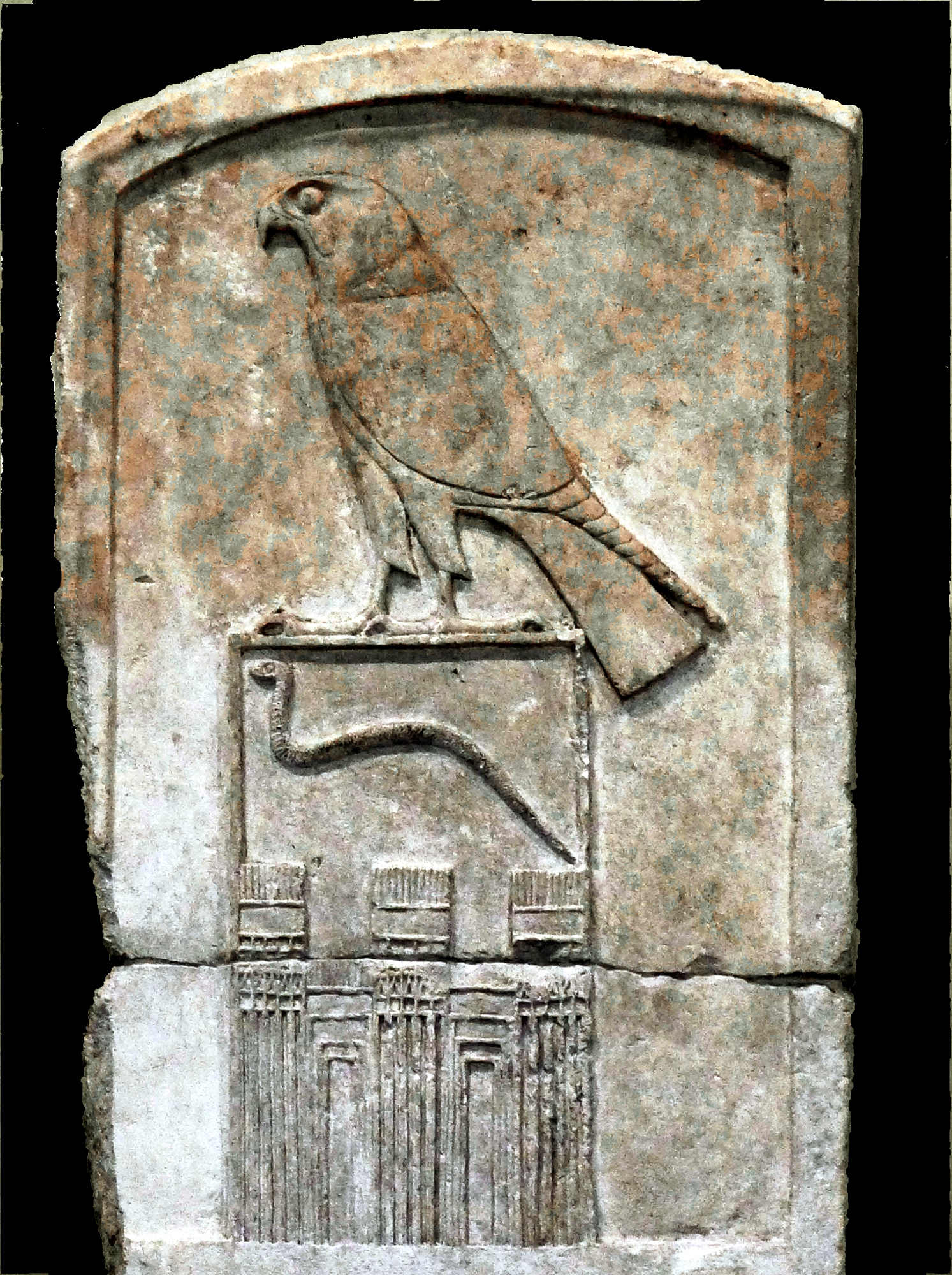
Djet

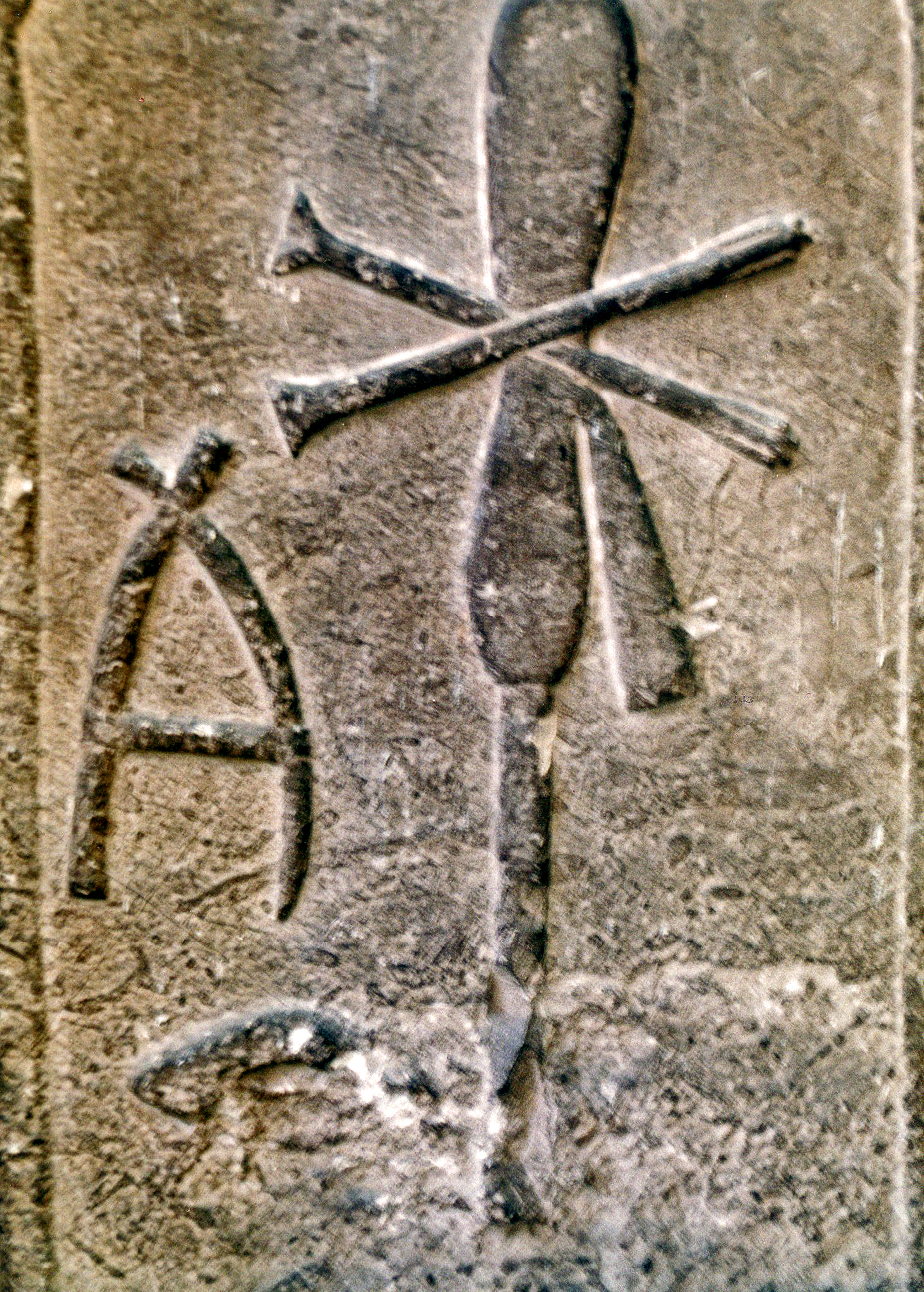
Merneith

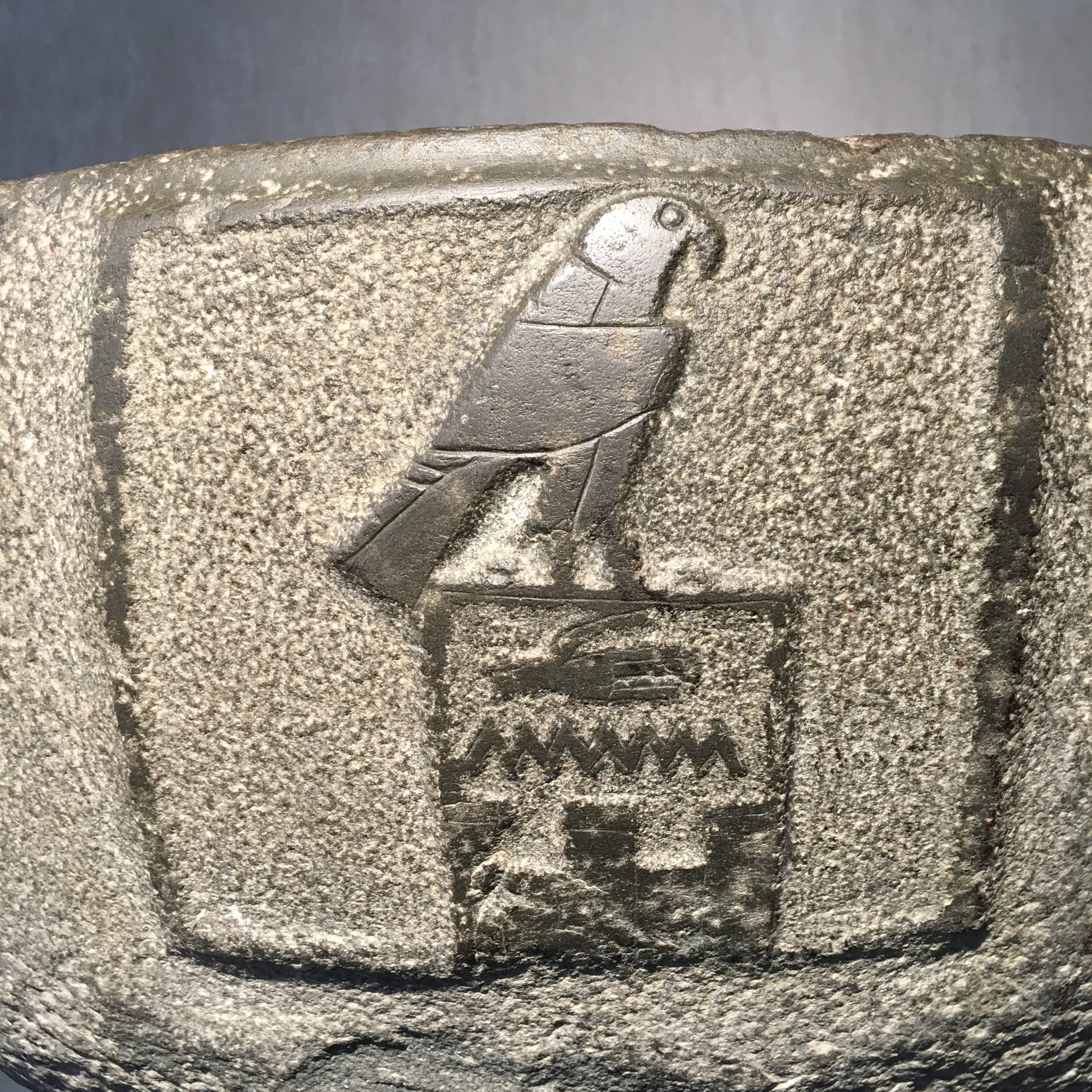
Den

Semerkhet

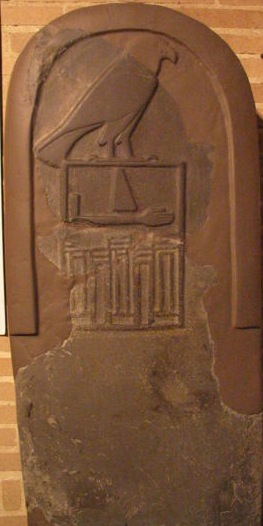
Qaa

== Second Dynasty tombs ==
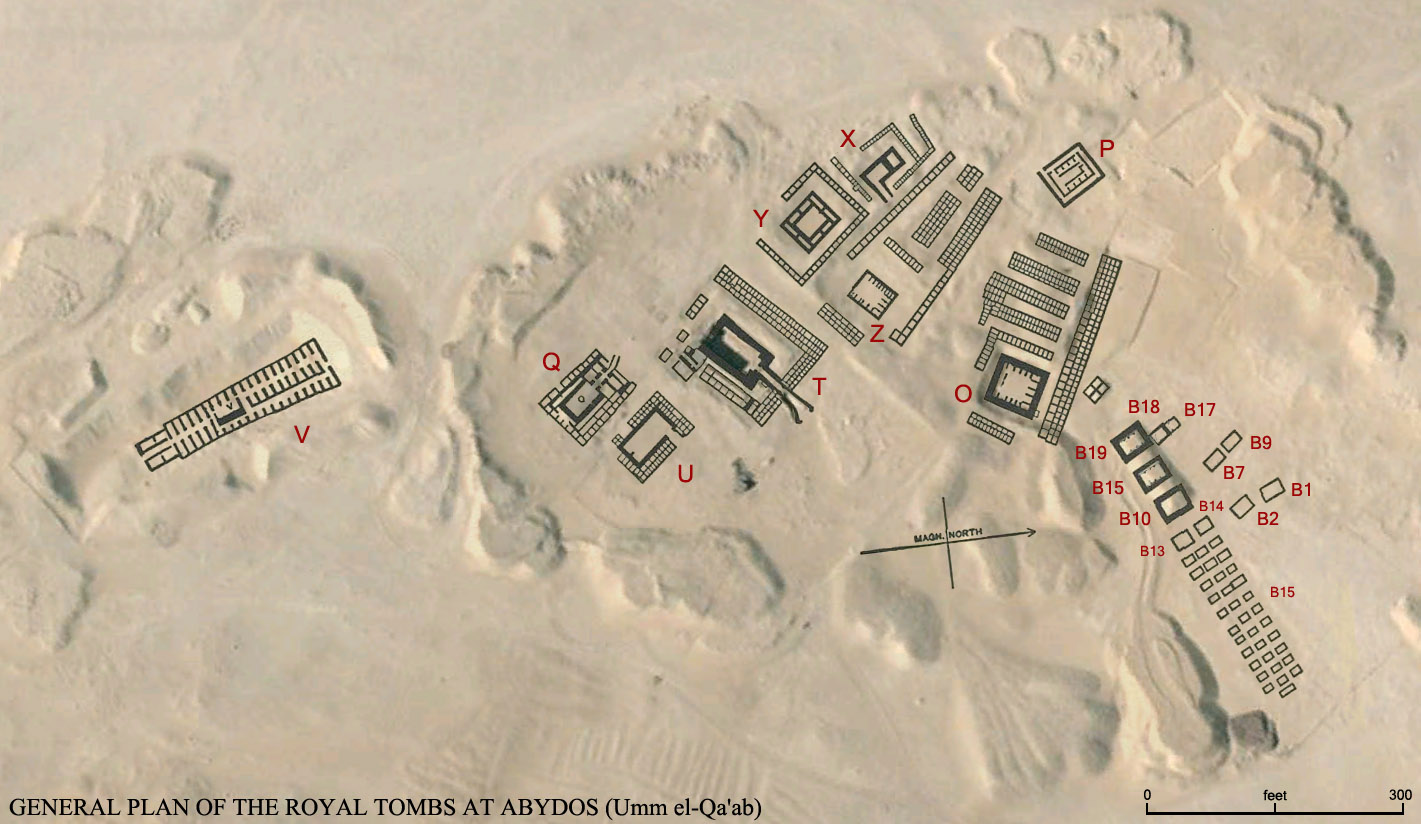
Tombs of the Egyptian 1st and 2nd dynasty

At the beginning of the Second Dynasty (2,775 BCE), Egyptian kings were buried at Saqqara rather than Umm el-Qa'ab. However, this changed with the tombs of the dynasty's last two kings being located at Umm el-Qa'ab in Cemetery B.

- P: Peribsen. A seal found in this tomb contains the first full sentence written in hieroglyphs.
- V: Khasekhemwy. This tomb was on a massive scale, with several interconnecting mud-brick chambers, and the actual burial chamber being constructed of dressed limestone blocks. Its measurements were: 68.97 m long and 10.04-17.06 wide. When excavated by Petrie in 1901 it contained a scepter made from sard and banded with gold, limestone vases with golden covers, and a ewer and basin of bronze.

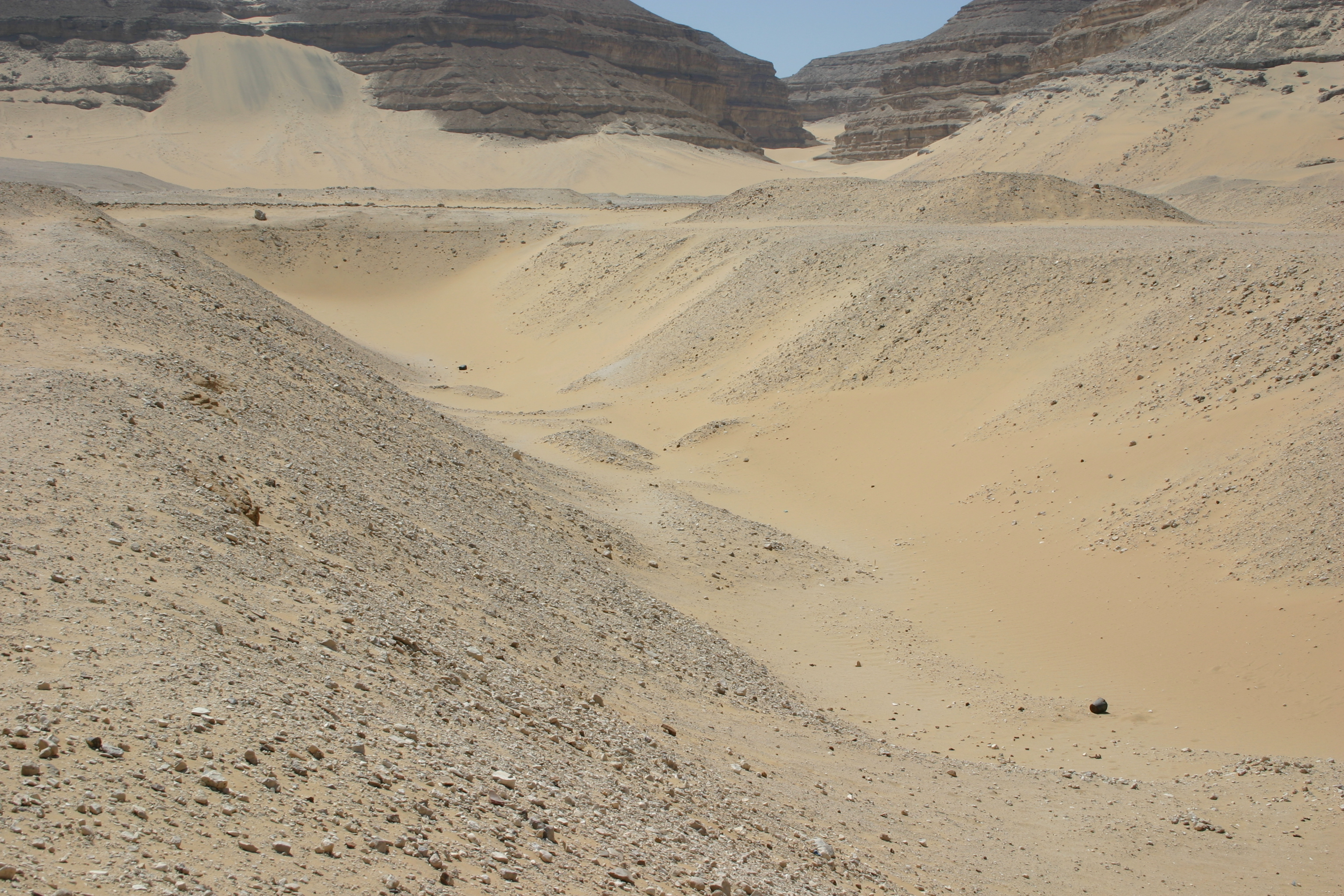
The site of Khasekhemwy's tomb, filled with sand

=== Tomb stelas ===
Note that Peribsen's stela is the only serekh to be topped with Seth instead of Horus (albeit the stele later had Seth erased), whereas Khasekhemwy's stela has both Horus and Seth on top of his serekh as a symbol of his reunification of Egypt.

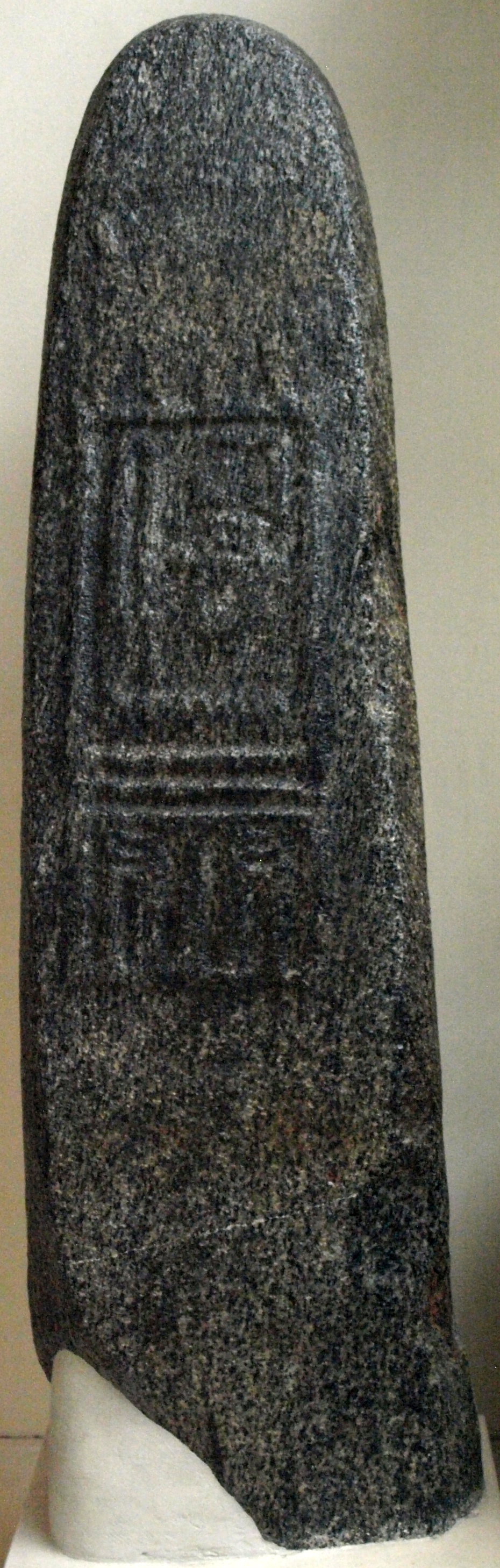
Peribsen

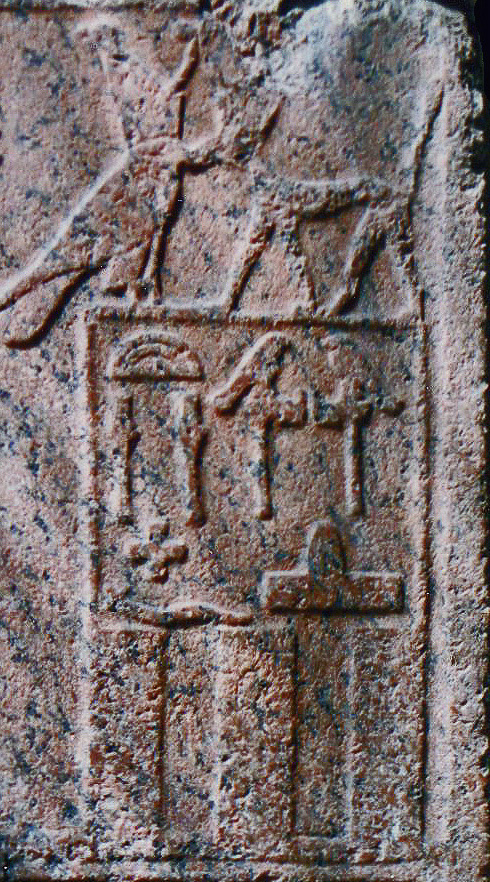
Khasekhemwy

== Activity during the Second and Third Dynasty ==
There is evidence that the tombs at Umm el-Qa'ab were looted and burned in the late Second Dynasty during the time period between Nynetjer and Khasekhemwy, when the country was split and ruled by two successors due to the overly complex state administration of the whole of Egypt.

On the east side of the Pyramid of Djoser at Saqqara, eleven shafts 32 m deep were constructed and annexed to horizontal tunnels for royal family members. These were incorporated into the pre-existing substructure as it expanded eastward. In the storerooms along here over 40,000 stone vessels were found, many of which predate Djoser. Shafts I–V were used for the burials of royal family members, but shafts VI–XI were used as symbolic tombs for the grave goods of royal ancestors from dynasties I–II. More than 40,000 vessels, bowls and vases made of various kinds of stone were found in these galleries. Royal names such as of kings Den, Semerkhet, Nynetjer and Sekhemib were incised on the pots, showing they came from both the tombs in Umm el-Qa'ab and in Saqqara. It is now thought that Djoser once restored the original tombs of the ancestors after Egypt's reunification, and then sealed the grave goods in the galleries in an attempt to save them from further destruction. Not a lot of info is provided on Abydos during the rest of the Old Kingdom of Egypt.

== Activity during the Tenth and Eleventh Dynasty ==
In the Teaching for King Merykara, the author, First Intermediate Period king of Egypt, Wahkare Khety address his son, the future king Merikare, advising him on how to be a good king, and how to avoid evil. In the text, the destruction of sacred territory at Abydos and Thinis is recorded; the king expresses remorse, as if accepting responsibility for the unthinkable that must have recurred throughout history – sacrilege in the name of the ruling king, subject to divine retribution during a judgment of the dead. This confirms that the tombs at Umm el-Qa'ab were looted again at the middle of the First Intermediate Period.

In the 14th year of the reign of Mentuhotep II, the conquest of the Thinite region by the Herakleopolitan kings occurred. However, the armies of Merikare apparently looted and desecrated the sacred tombs at Umm el-Qa'ab in the process, confirming the third time the tombs were looted. As a result, the 14th year of Mentuhotep's reign is indeed named Year of the crime of Thinis in later Egyptian records.

== Osiris cult and annual festival ==
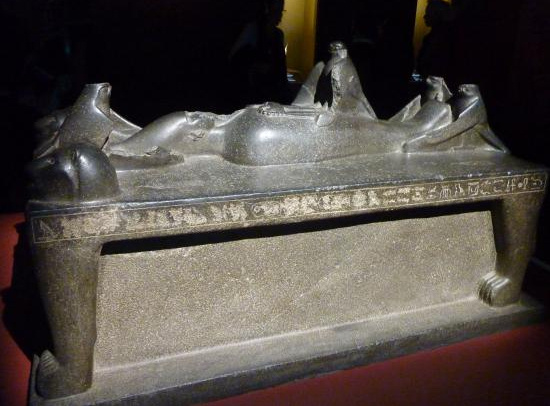
Osiris basalt statue found in Djer's tomb. Dedicated by king Khendjer of the 13th Dynasty and discovered by E. Amelineau

Osiris related cultic activity is thought to have begun at the location in the Second Intermediate Period of Egypt based on pottery and the partially erased inscription on the statue of Osiris. Evidence of Osiris' affiliation with the site was highlighted after E. Amélineau discovered a basalt statue of Osiris in the refurbished tomb of king Djer.

Greco-Roman period stela. Prayer to Osiris

An annual festival dedicated to Osiris began during the Middle Kingdom and his temple became a site of pilgrimage. King Djer's tomb, now reinterpreted as Osiris' tomb, became inextricably linked to the temple as a result of the festival. The festival was held between July and September, coinciding with the annual inundation of the Nile. Priests associated with Osiris' cult would carry an image of the god out from his temple, travel along the processional valley, and bury the image at Umm el-Qa'ab. After burying the image, it would be ritualistically regenerated and returned to the temple along the same processional route. The processional route between Umm el-Qa'ab and the Osiris temple played an integral role during the festival as his myth was ceremonially reenacted along the route. The ritual significance of the causeway between Umm el-Qa'ab and Osiris' temple is further highlighted by Edouard Naville's discovery of six Osiris figures made of mud only 40 meters away from Djer's tomb.

The annual festival along with various cultic activities continued at Umm el-Qa'ab for around 1,500 years after being formally established. Chapter 169 of the Book of the Dead, a text found among New Kingdom and later period burials, directly references the annual festival. Aside from King Djer's tomb, tombs of other First Dynasty rulers such as Den and Qa'a were likely centers of cult practice. 18th Dynasty votive offerings were found near these early royal tombs in pits located 8 meters away from the burials.

During the Kushute Twenty-fifth Dynasty of Egypt period burials were conducted there including royal ones. Osiris offering pottery from this period has also been found there.

== See also ==
- Cities of the ancient Near East
- Dynasties of ancient Egypt
- Egyptian chronology
- Minshat Abu Omar
