= Semerkhet =

Egyptian pharaoh

- Semempses, Mempses
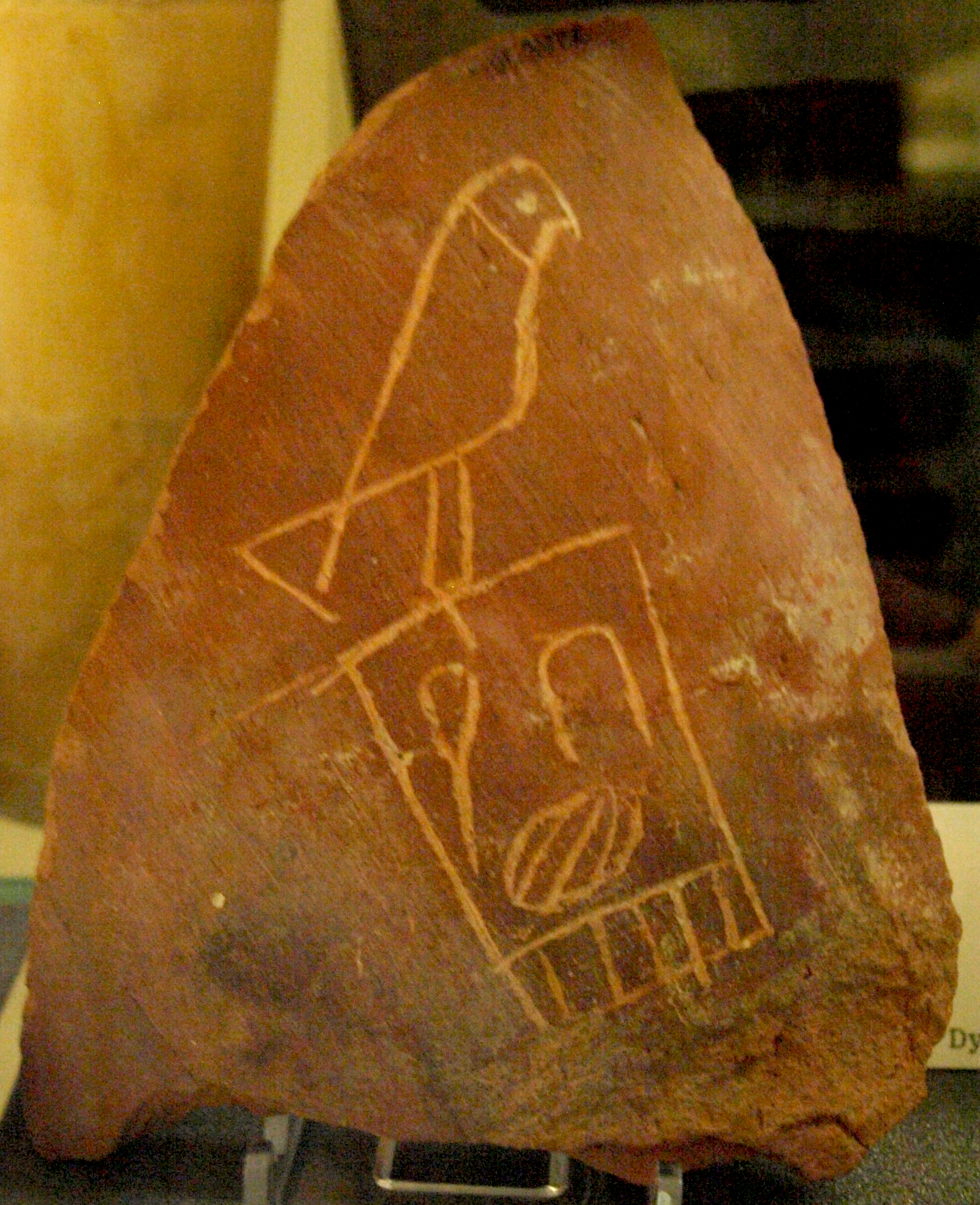
- Pottery shard inscribed with Semerkhet's serekh, originally from his tomb, now in the Petrie Museum, UC 36756

Pharaoh
- Reign: 8½ years, ca. 2920 BC
- Predecessor: Anedjib
- Successor: Qa'a
Royal titulary
Horus name
Hor-Semerkhet
Ḥr-smr.ẖt
Horus, Companion of the divine community
Alternative:
Horus, Companion of the gods
G5	S29 U23 F32
Prenomen
Nisut-Bity-Nebty-Iry
nsw.t-bty-nb.ty-iry
King of Upper and Lower Egypt, he of the two ladies,
he who belongs to them
Alternative:
He whom the two ladies guard
M23 t L2 t G16 A21A
Abydos King List
Iry?/Semsu?
iry?/smsw?
< A21A >
Turin King List
Semsem
smsm
Horus the Elder
< S29 m S29 m > G7
- Father: Anedjib ? Den ?
- Mother: Betrest
- Burial: Tomb U, Umm el-Qa'ab
- Dynasty: First Dynasty

Semerkhet is the Horus name of an early Egyptian king who ruled during the First Dynasty. This ruler became known through a tragic legend handed down by the historian Manetho, who reported that a calamity of some sort occurred during Semerkhet's reign. The archaeological records seem to support the view that Semerkhet had a difficult time as king and some early archaeologists questioned the legitimacy of Semerkhet's succession to the Egyptian throne.

== Length of reign ==
Manetho named Semerkhet Semêmpsés and credited him with a reign of 18 years, whilst the Royal Canon of Turin credited him with an implausibly long figure of 72 years, which may be his lifespan. Egyptologists and historians now consider both statements as exaggerations and credit Semerkhet with a reign of 8½ years. This evaluation is based on the Cairo Stone inscription, where the complete reign of Semerkhet has been recorded. Additionally, they point to the archaeological records, which strengthen the view that Semerkhet had a relatively short reign.

== Name sources ==
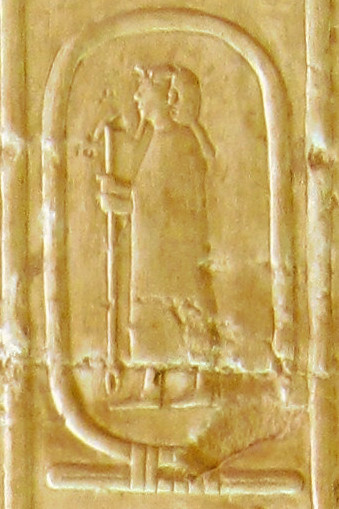
Semsu, cartouche name of Semerkhet in the Abydos king list

Semerkhet is well attested in archaeological records. His name appears in inscriptions on vessels made of schist, alabaster, breccia, and marble. His name is also preserved on ivory tags and earthen jar seals. Objects bearing Semerkhet's name and titles come from Abydos and Sakkara.

Semerkhet's serekh name is commonly translated as "companion of the divine community" or "thoughtful friend". The latter translation is questioned by many scholars, since the hieroglyph khet (Gardiner-sign F32) normally was the symbol for "body" or "divine community".

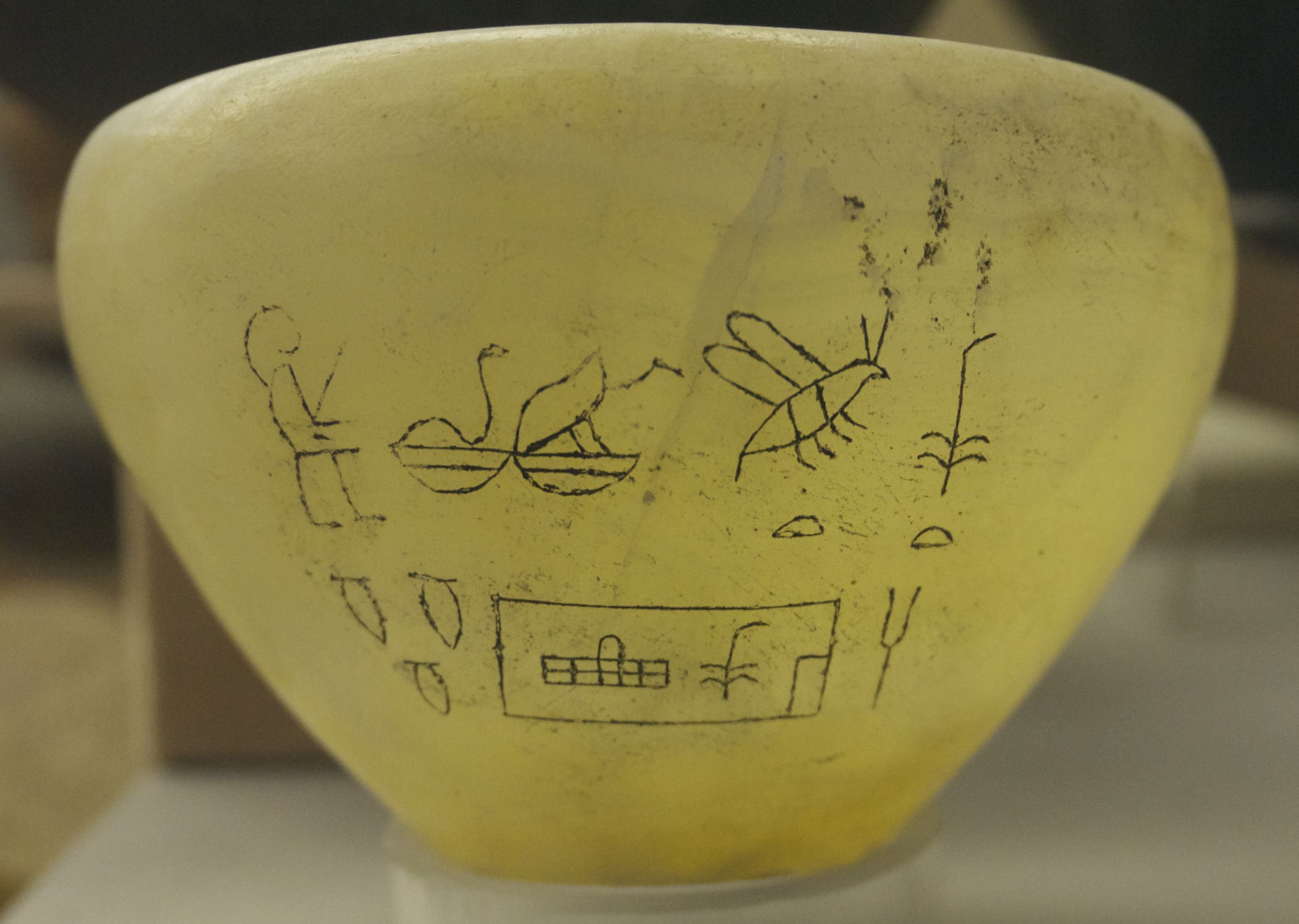
Alabaster vase marked King Iry-Nebty visits the house-of-the-pleased-king, oil jars for it, National Archaeological Museum, France

Semerkhet's birth name is more problematic. Any artefact showing his birth name curiously lacks any artistic detail of the used hieroglyphic sign: a walking man with waving cloak or skirt, a nemes head dress, and a long, plain stick in his hands. The reading and meaning of this special sign is disputed, since it doesn't appear in this form before association with king Semerkhet. Indeed, the hieroglyph of the cloaked man is extremely rare. It appears only twice in relief inscriptions depicting ceremonial processions of priests and standard bearers. Egyptologists such as Toby Wilkinson, Bernhard Grdseloff, and Jochem Kahl read Iry-Netjer, meaning "divine guardian". During the Old Kingdom period, this word is written with uniliteral signs of a netjer flag (Gardiner-sign R8) and a human eye (Gardiner-sign D4) nearby the ideogram of the man. Some contemporary ivory tags show the Nebty name written with the single eye symbol only. Thus, the scholars also read Semerkhet's throne name as Iry (meaning "guardian") and the Nebty name as Iry-Nebty (meaning "guardian of the Two Ladies"). This reconstruction is strengthened by the observation that Semerkhet was the first king using the Nebty title in its ultimate form. For unknown reason Semerkhet did not use the Nebuy title of his predecessor. It seems that he felt connected with the 'Two Ladies', a title referring to the goddesses Nekhbet and Wadjet, the patron deities of the Ancient Egyptians who were worshiped by all after the unification of its two parts, Lower Egypt, and Upper Egypt. The Nebty title in turn was thought to function as an addition to the Nisut-Bity title. His prenomen is Nisut-Bity-Nebty-Iry, nsw.t-bty-nb.ty-iry meaning, King of Upper and Lower Egypt, he of the two ladies, and he who belongs to them or He whom the two ladies guard.

M23 t L2 t G16 A21A

Scribes and priests of the Ramesside era were also confused, because the archaic ideogram that was used during Semerkhet's lifetime was very similar to the sign of an old man with a walking stick (Gardiner sign A19). This had been read as Semsu or Sem and means "the eldest". It was used as a title identifying someone as the head of the house. Due to this uncertainty, it seems that the compiler of the Abydos king list simply tried to imitate the original figure, whilst the author of the Royal Canon of Turin seems to have been convinced about reading it as the Gardiner-sign A19 and he wrote Semsem meaning, Horus the Elder, with uniliteral signs. The Saqqara King List omits Semerkhet's throne name. The reason for that is unknown, but all kings from Narmer up to king Den also are missing their throne names.

== Identity ==
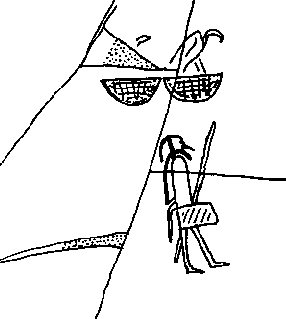
Nebty name of Semerkhet from Djoser's pyramid complex at Saqqara

Virtually nothing is known about Semerkhet's family. His parents are unknown, but it is thought that one of his predecessors, king Den, might have been his father. Possibly, Semerkhet was born to queen Betrest. On the Cairo Stone she is described as his mother, but definite evidence for that view has not yet been found. It would be expected that Semerkhet had sons and daughters, but their names have not been preserved in the historical record. A candidate as a possible member of his family line is his immediate successor, king Qa'a.

== Reign ==
Ivory label of Semerkhet
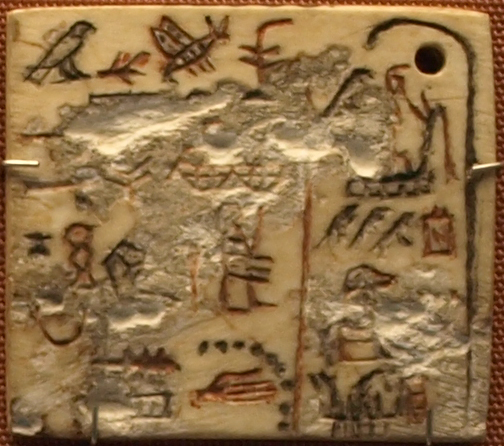
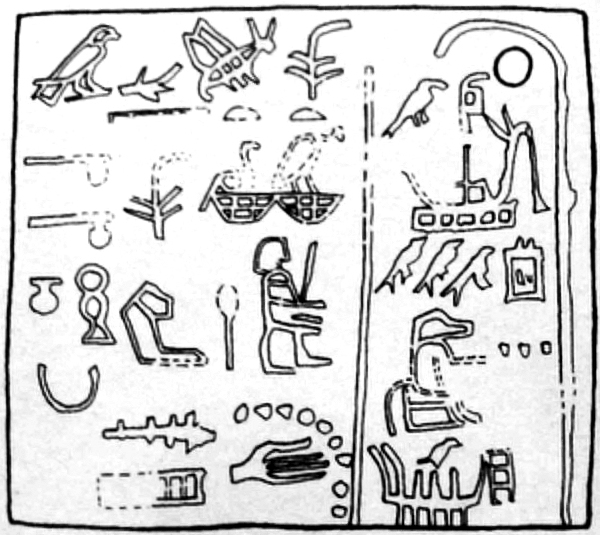
Ivory label of Semerkhet, on display in the British Museum. The right section, introduced by the 'year'-sign Renpet (a bald palm stem), reports -from top to bottom- a feast of the Sokar-bark, a visitation to the temple of the ancestor-deity, Wer-Wadyt, and the travelling in a royal boat. The left part of the label shows the throne name Iry-Nebty of Semerkhet with a blessing wish below. On the upper left corner is described the content of the jar, to which the label was once adjusted. Also the name of the high official Henuka is preserved, who was obviously responsible for the delivery of the mentioned jar.

=== Usurper debate ===
An old theory, supported by Egyptologists and historians such as Jean-Philippe Lauer, Walter Bryan Emery, Wolfgang Helck, and Michael Rice once held that Semerkhet was a usurper and not the rightful heir to the throne. Their assumption was based on the observation that a number of stone vessels with Semerkhet's name on them, originally were inscribed with king Adjib's name. Semerkhet simply erased Adjib's name and replaced it with his own. Furthermore, they point out that no high official and priest associated with Semerkhet was found at Sakkara. All other kings, such as Den and Adjib, are attested in local mastabas.

Today this theory has little support. Egyptologists such as Toby Wilkinson, I. E. S. Edwards, and Winifred Needler deny the 'usurping theory', because Semerkhet's name is mentioned on stone vessel inscriptions along with those of Den, Adjib, and Qa'a. The objects were found in the underground galleries beneath the Pyramid of Djoser at Saqqara. The inscriptions show that king Qa'a, immediate successor of Semerkhet and sponsor of the vessels, accepted Semerkhet as a rightful ancestor and heir to the throne. Furthermore, the Egyptologists point out that nearly every king of First Dynasty had the habit of taking special vessels (so-called 'anniversary vessels') from their predecessor's tomb and then replacing their predecessor's name with their own. Semerkhet not only confiscated Adjib's vessels, in his tomb several artefacts from the necropolis of queen Meritneith and king Den also were found. The lack of any high official's tomb at Saqqara might be explained by the rather short reign of Semerkhet. It seems that the only known official of Semerkhet, Henu-Ka, had survived his king: His name appears on ivory tags from Semerkhet's and Qaa's tomb.

=== Celebration of certain rituals ===
Seal impressions from Semerkhet's burial site show the new royal domain, Hor wep-khet, (meaning "Horus, the judge of the divine community") and the new private household Hut-Ipty (meaning "house of the harem"), which was headed by Semerkhet's wives. Two ivory tags show the yearly 'Escort of Horus', a feast connected to the regular tax collections. Other tags report the cult celebration for the deity of the ancestors, Wer-Wadyt ("the Great White"). Further tags show the celebration of a first (and only) Sokar feast.

=== Year by year records ===
While the Cairo Stone reports the whole of Semerkhet's reign, unfortunately, the surface of the stone slab is badly worn and most of the events are now illegible. The following chart follows the reconstructions by Toby A. H. Wilkinson, John D. Degreef, and Hermann Alexander Schlögl:

Semerkhet's registers on the Cairo Stone.

Cairo Stone, main fragment:

- Year of coronation: Appearance of the king of Lower- and Upper Egypt; unifying the two realms; circumambulation of the White Wall of Memphis
- 1st year: Following of Horus; destruction of Egypt
- 2nd year: Appearance of the king; creation of a statue for Seshat and Sed
- 3rd year: Following of Horus... (rest is missing)
- 4th year: Appearance of the king of Upper Egypt; creation of the building ‘throne of Horus the harpooner’
- 5th year: Following of Horus, creating an image of Min
- 6th year: Appearance of the king of Lower and Upper Egypt, festival of Sopdu
- 7th year: Following of Horus... (rest is missing)
- 8th year: Appearance of the king of Lower and Upper Egypt, creating an image of a cattle deity
- year of death: The ...th month and ...th day. (damaged)

=== "Calamity" ===
Egyptologists and historians pay special attention to the entry "Destruction of Egypt" in the second window of Semerkhet's year records. The inscription gives no further information about that event, but it has a resemblance to Manetho's report. The Eusebian version says: "His son, Semémpsês, who reigned for 18 years; in his reign a very great calamity befell Egypt." The Armenian version sounds similar: "Mempsis, 18 years. Under him many portents happened and a great pestilence occurred." None of the documents from after Semerkhet's reign provide any details about this "calamity".

== Tomb ==
Map of Semerkhet's tomb in the Umm el-Qa'ab

Semerkhet's burial site was excavated in 1899 by archaeologist and Egyptologist Sir William Matthew Flinders Petrie at Abydos and is known as "Tomb U". While excavating, Petrie found no stairways as he did at the necropolis of Den and Adjib. He found a ramp, four metres wide and leading straight into the main chamber. The ramp starts approximately ten metres east outside the tomb and has a base slope of 12°. Inside the tomb the ramp shows irregular graduations. Petrie was also confused by the small number of clay seals. Only 17 seals were found. For archaeologists and Egyptologists, the complete arrangement of the burial site suggests that the builders were pressed for time. When Petrie freed the ramp from sand, he found that the complete ramp was thickly covered in aromatic oil, which still gave off a scent. Beside the ramp several wooden and hand-made baskets and earthen jars were found. These were dated to the Ramesside era. Scholars now think that Semerkhet's tomb was re-opened and restored when Ramesside priests and kings saw the tomb of king Djer as the ritual burial of Osiris's head. The findings inside the main chamber included precious objects such as inlays and fragments of furniture (especially pedestals), copper-made armatures, and jewelry made of ebony, amethyst, and turquoise. Some vessels originating from the Levant were also found. They once contained Bescha oil, which was of great value to the Egyptians. Outside the tomb, close to the entrance, a damaged tomb stela made of black granite displaying Semerkhet's serekh name was excavated.

The burial chamber measures 29.2 × 20.8 metres and is of simple construction. Petrie found that the king's mastaba once covered the whole of the subsidiary tombs. Now the royal burial formed a unit with the 67 subsidiary tombs. Egyptologists such as Walter Bryan Emery and Toby Wilkinson see this architectural development as proof that the royal family and household were killed willingly when their royal family head had died. Wilkinson goes further and thinks that Semerkhet, as the godlike king, tried to demonstrate his power over the death and life of his servants and family members even in their afterlife. The tradition of burying the family and court of the king when he died was abandoned at the time of king Qaa, one of the last rulers of the First Dynasty. The tombs of Second Dynasty founder, Hotepsekhemwy, onward have no subsidiary tombs.

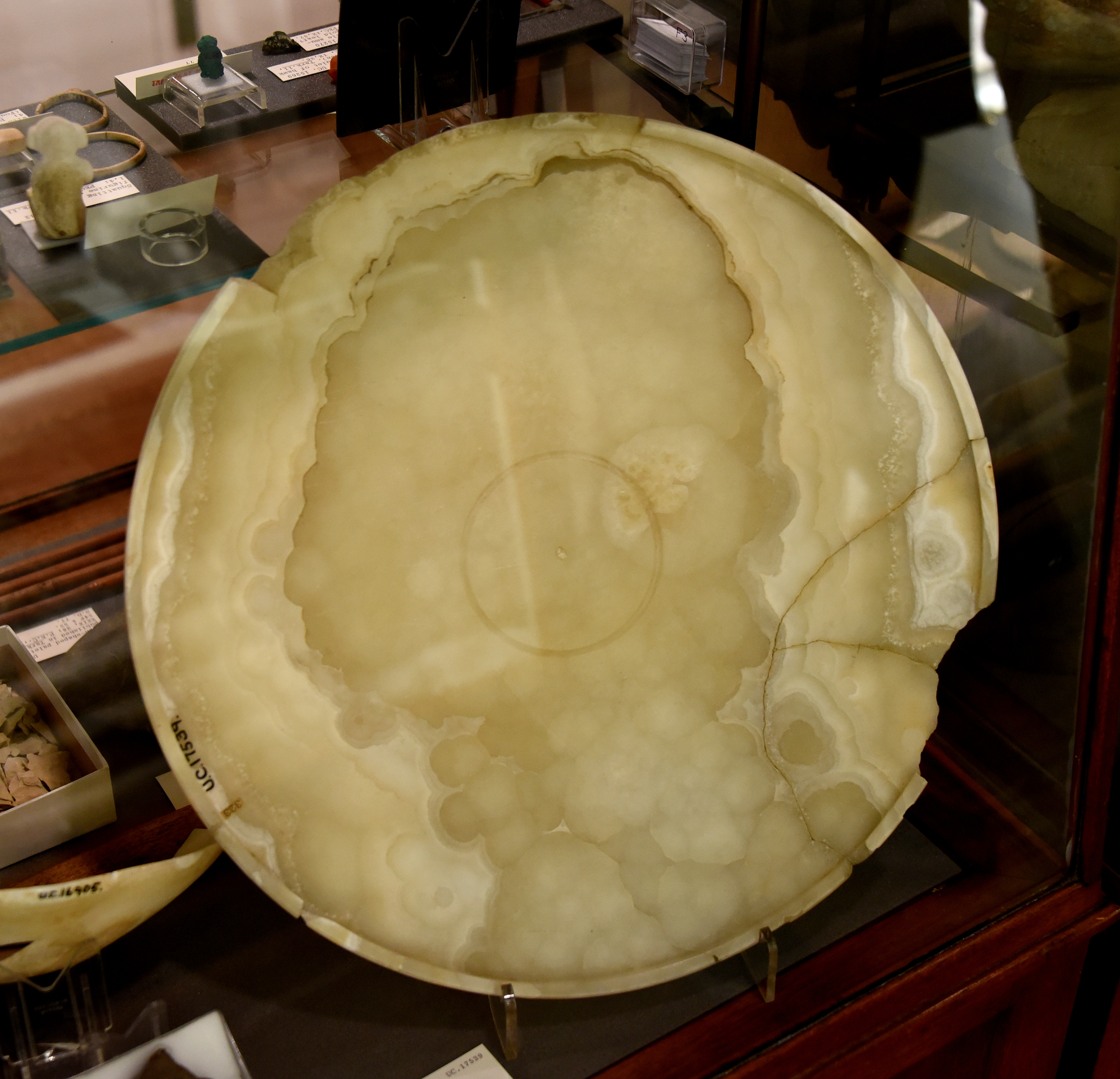
Calcite dish, from Royal Tomb "U", Semerkhet, at Abydos, Egypt, First Dynasty, The Petrie Museum of Egyptian Archaeology, London

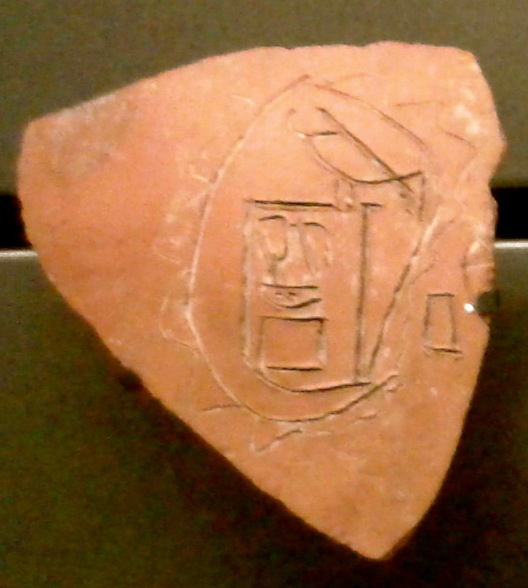
Pottery shard bearing Semerkhet's serekh, on display at the Musée du Louvre

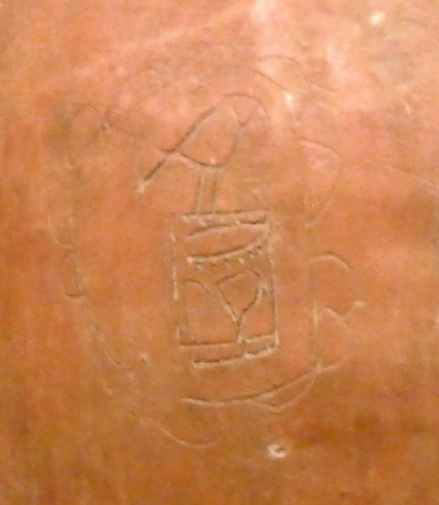
Clay jar incised with Semerkhet's serekh, Musée du Louvre

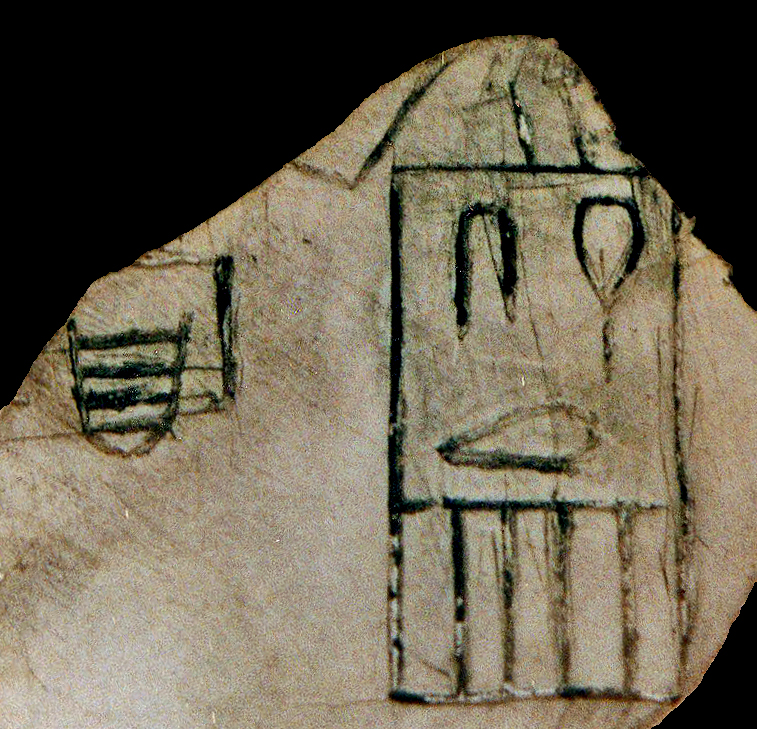
Fragment of a vessel of white marble bearing the serekh of Semerkhet, at the left of the serekh a per bja, meaning "brazen house" or "house of ore", is mentioned, Egyptian Museum, Cairo

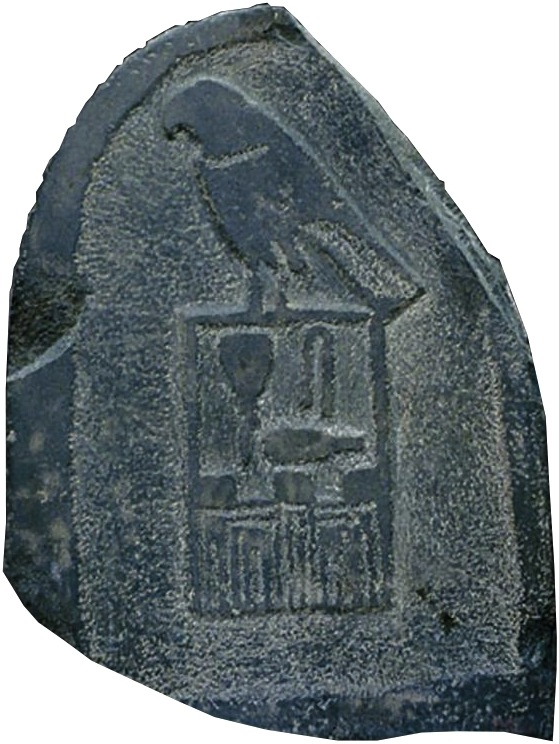
Tomb stela of Semerkhet

Preceded by Anedjib	Pharaoh of Egypt	Succeeded by Qa'a
