= Émile Amélineau =

French archaeologist

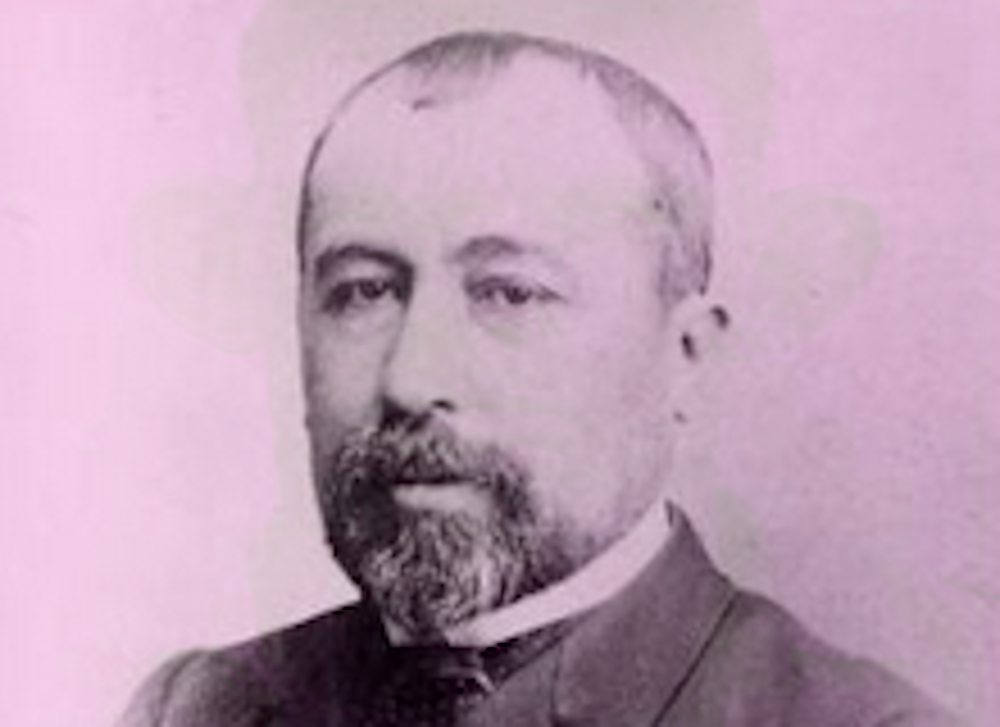
- Born: 1850; La Chaize-Giraud, France
- Died: 12 January 1915 (aged 64–65); Châteaudun, France

Academic work
- Discipline: Coptology archaeology Egyptology

Émile Amélineau (1850 – 12 January 1915) was a French Coptologist, archaeologist and Egyptologist. His scholarly reputation was established as an editor of previously unpublished Coptic texts. His reputation was destroyed by his work as a digger at Abydos, after Flinders Petrie re-excavated the site and showed how much destruction Amélineau had wrought.

== Career ==
Amélineau began his career by studying theology and was ordained as a priest prior to 1878. Between 1878 and 1883 he studied Egyptology and Coptic at Paris under the direction of Gaston Maspero and Eugène Grébaut. In 1883 he was a member of the French archaeological mission at Cairo, and renounced his orders. In 1887 he submitted his thesis, on Egyptian gnosticism. Thereafter he held a number of academic posts in France.

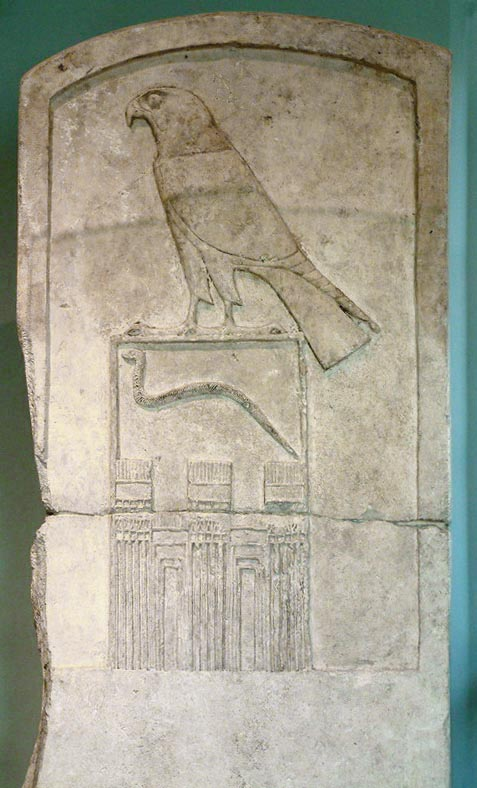
Tomb stele of the pharaoh Djet discovered by Émile Amélineau, now on display at the Louvre

Amélineau published great quantities of Coptic literature. He was perhaps the greatest Coptic scholar of his generation.

He undertook an ambitious project to edit the literary remains of Shenoute, the founder of Coptic monasticism. He first published a collection of Coptic and Arabic texts, all more or less related to this subject (1888–95), and then a corpus of Shenoute's own works (1907–14). Work on the latter was interrupted by his death. Stephen Emmel has said that his publication of these texts was "too full of errors to be relied on for serious purposes", but that no one else has undertaken the task.

Amélineau also excavated in Egypt, at a period when archaeology had yet to become a scientific subject distinguishable from tomb raiding or treasure hunting. Much of his work was on the Early Dynastic period of Ancient Egypt. In 1895 he discovered a stele inscribed with the name of pharaoh Djet. This object is now on display at the Louvre. He was the first archaeologist to excavate the tombs of the First Dynasty pharaohs of Ancient Egypt at the Umm el-Qa'ab section of Abydos, his findings outlined in several volumes of material published in the early years of the 20th century.

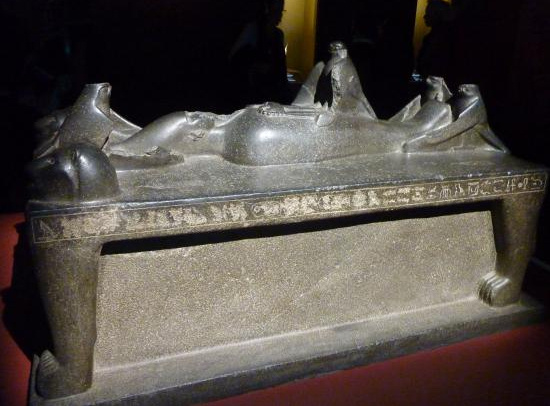
Osiris basalt statue found in Djer's tomb. Dedicated by king Khendjer of the 13th Dynasty and discovered by E. Amelineau.

But his work as an excavator has attracted strong criticism, not least from Flinders Petrie, the founder of modern scientific Egyptology. Émile Amélineau dug at Abydos, Egypt from 1894 to 1898. Petrie was awarded the concession to dig there by Gaston Maspero, head of the Antiquities Service, after Amélineau had declared that there was nothing more to be found there. Petrie was appalled at what had been done, and did not mince his words. He wrote:

"During four years there had been the scandal of Amelineau's work at the Royal Tombs of Abydos. He had been given a concession to work there for five years; no plans were kept (a few incorrect ones were made later), there was no record of where things were found, no useful publication. He boasted that he had reduced to chips the pieces of stone vases which he did not care to remove, and burnt up the remains of the woodwork of the 1st dynasty in his kitchen."

Amélineau was so well connected that it was felt to be unsafe to tell him that the concession had been reassigned in case he came back, and he did not discover what had happened until some years later.

Amelineau responded to the criticism in his tardy publication of his finds. But the fact was that his work merely produced a series of finds of tombs and artefacts, while Petrie, by sifting the rubble that Amélineau left behind, was able to establish the whole chronology of the First dynasty. Petrie's work using scientific methods established Petrie's reputation, and conversely severely damaged that of Amélineau. Jane A. Hill has said that "Amelineau was not an archaeologist and basically plundered the cemetery in search of goods he could sell to antiquities collectors."

One example of the limitations of Amélineau's work is that 18 of the 20 ivory and ebony labels describing key events in the reign of the pharaoh Den known to come from that king's tomb were found by Flinders Petrie in the spoil heaps left by Amélineau's earlier excavation of that tomb.

In 1905 Amélineau donated a portion of his collection to the Society of Archaeology of Châteaudun, which is now on display at its Museum of Fine Arts and Natural History.

== Works ==
- Fragments coptes du Nouveau Testament dans le dialecte thébain, Recueil de travaux relatifs à la philologie, V (1884), pp. 105–139.
- Fragments de la version thebaine de l'ecriture (Ancien Testament), Recueil de travaux relatifs à la philologie, V (1886), pp. 10 ff.
- Essai sur le gnosticisme égyptien, ses développements et son origine égyptienne, E. Leroux, Paris, 1887.
- Contes et romans de l'Égypte chrétienne (Paris, 1888)
- La géographie de l'Egypte à l'époque copte (Paris, 1893)
- Essai sur l'évolution historique et philosophique des idées morales dans l'ancienne Égypte, E. Leroux, Paris, 1895.
- Les nouvelles fouilles d'Abydos, 1896-1897, compte-rendu in extenso des fouilles..., E. Leroux, Paris, 1902.
- Notice des manuscrits coptes de la Bibliothèque Nationale (Paris: 1895)
- Avec A. Lemoine, Les nouvelles fouilles d'Abydos, 1897-1898, compte-rendu in extenso des fouilles..., E. Leroux, Paris, 1904–1905.
- Prolégomènes à l'étude de la religion égyptienne, essai sur la mythologie de l'Égypte, n°21, Bibliothèque de l'école des hautes études, E. Leroux, Paris, 1908.
