= Ancient Egyptian royal titulary =

Naming convention of the pharaohs of ancient Egypt

The royal titulary or royal protocol is the standard naming convention taken by the pharaohs of ancient Egypt. It symbolised worldly power and holy might, also acting as a sort of mission statement for the duration of a monarch's reign (although sometimes it even changed during the reign).

The full titulary, consisting of five names, did not come into standard usage until the Middle Kingdom but remained in use as late as the Roman Empire.

== Origins ==
In order that the pharaoh, who held divine office, could be linked to the people and the gods, special epithets were created for them at their accession to the throne. These titles also served to demonstrate one's qualities and link them to the terrestrial realm. The five names were developed over the centuries beginning with the Horus name. This name identified the figure as a representative of the god Horus. The Nebty name was the second part of the royal titular of Upper and Lower Egypt. This name placed the king under the protection of two female deities, Nekhbet and Wadjet and began sometime towards the end of the First Dynasty as a reference to "The one who belongs to Upper and Lower Egypt", along with mention of the Two Ladies. Beginning sometime in the Fourth Dynasty of Egypt, the Gold Falcon name (sometimes called the Horus of Gold) was created. The last two names of the king, the prenomen and the nomen, were generally depicted within the circular, roped cartouche of the king (eventually the cartouche would contain all royal names, including the queen and the royal children) and were known as the Throne name and the Son of Re name.

== Horus name ==
𓅃𓊁

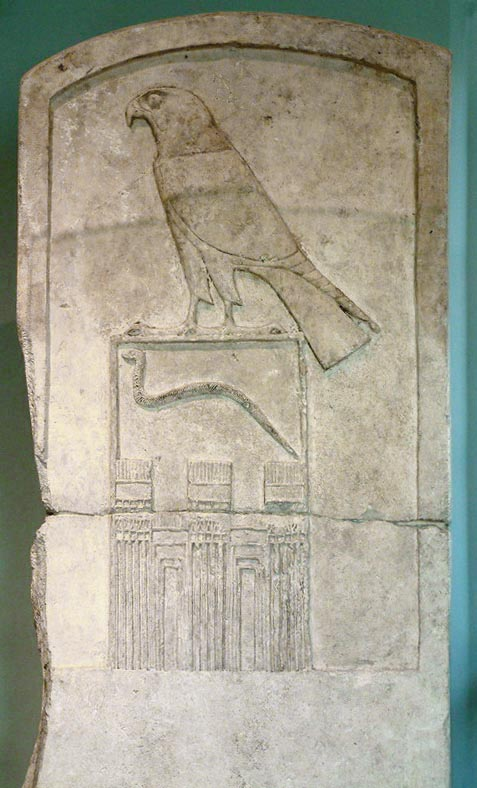
Serekh containing the name of Djet and an association with Wadjet, on display at the Louvre

The Horus name is the oldest form of the pharaoh's name, originating in prehistoric Egypt. Many of the oldest-known Egyptian pharaohs were known only by this title.

The Horus name was usually written in a serekh, a representation of a palace façade. The name of the pharaoh was written in hieroglyphs inside this representation of a palace. Typically an image of the falcon god Horus was perched on top of or beside it.

At least one Egyptian ruler, the Second Dynasty pharaoh Seth-Peribsen, used an image of the god Set instead of Horus, perhaps signifying an internal religious division within the country. He was succeeded by Khasekhemwy, who placed the symbols of both Set and Horus above his name. Thereafter, the image of Horus always appeared alongside the name of the pharaoh.

By the time of the New Kingdom, the Horus name was often written without the enclosing serekh.

== Nebty ("two ladies") name ==
 G16

The Nebty name (lit. "two ladies") was associated with the so-called "heraldic" goddesses of Upper and Lower Egypt:

- Nekhbet, patron deity of Upper Egypt, represented by a vulture, and
- Wadjet, patron deity of Lower Egypt, represented by a cobra.

The name is first definitively used by the First Dynasty pharaoh Semerkhet, though it only became a fully independent title by the Twelfth Dynasty.

This particular name was not typically framed by a cartouche or serekh, but always begins with the hieroglyphs of a vulture and cobra resting upon two baskets, the dual noun "nebty".

== Horus of Gold ==
 G8

Also known as the Golden Horus name, this form of the pharaoh's name typically featured the image of a Horus falcon perched above or beside the hieroglyph for gold.

The meaning of this particular title has been disputed. One belief is that it represents the triumph of Horus over his uncle Set, as the symbol for gold can be taken to mean that Horus was "superior to his foes". Gold also was strongly associated in the ancient Egyptian mind with eternity, so this may have been intended to convey the pharaoh's eternal Horus name.

Similar to the Nebty name, this particular name typically was not framed by a cartouche or serekh.

== Throne name (prenomen) ==
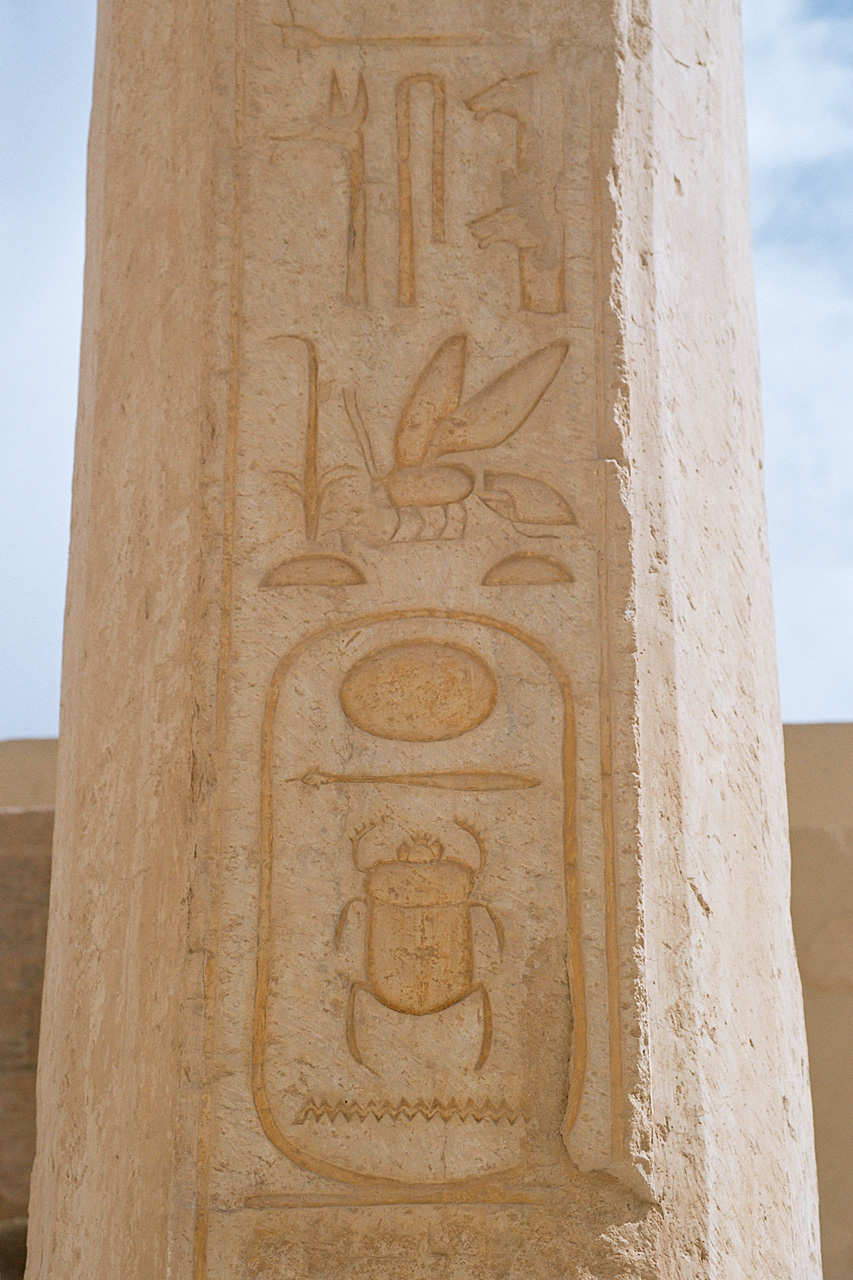
Praenomen of the Cartouche of Thutmose II preceded by Sedge and Bee symbols, Temple of Hatshepsut, Luxor

M23 t L2 t

The pharaoh's throne name, the first of the two names written inside a cartouche, usually accompanied the title nsw-bity (nsw(t)-bjt(j)), traditionally interpreted as "[He] of sedge [and] bee" and often translated for convenience as "King of Upper and of Lower Egypt". (The sedge and the bee symbolised Upper and Lower Egypt, respectively, although recent research has thrown this interpretation into doubt.)

The epithet nb tꜣwy, "Lord of the Two Lands", referring to the valley and delta regions of Egypt, often occurs as well.

Title was used universally regardless of ruler's gender. Female version of the title - nsjt-n-tꜣ-šmꜥ bjtjt-n-tꜣ-mḥw (nesit Ta-szema bitit Ta-mehu), which means "Queen of the land of Upper Egypt (and) Queen of the land of Lower Egypt" - is attested only for Cleopatra VII.

== Personal name (nomen) ==
 G39 N5

This was the name given at birth. The name itself was preceded by the title "Son of Ra", written with the hieroglyph of a duck (za), a homonym for the word meaning "son" (za), adjacent to an image of the sun, a hieroglyph for the chief solar deity Ra. It was first introduced to the set of royal titles in the Fourth Dynasty and emphasizes the king's role as a representative of the solar god Ra. For women who became pharaoh, the preceding title was interpreted as "daughter" also.

Modern historians typically refer to the ancient kings of Egypt by this name, adding ordinals (e.g. "II", "III") to distinguish between different individuals bearing the same name.

== Examples of the full titulary ==
=== Senusret I ===
In the Middle Kingdom, the full titulary was sometimes written in a single cartouche, as in this example from Senusret I, from Beni Hasan.

=== Hatshepsut ===
The full titulary of Eighteenth Dynasty pharaoh Hatshepsut, providing a guide to pronunciation and its equivalent meaning and showing the differences since this pharaoh is a woman, is as follows,

- Horus name: Wesretkau, "Mighty of Kas"
- Nebty name: Wadjrenput, "She of the Two Ladies, Flourishing of years"
- Golden Horus: Netjeretkhau, "Divine of appearance" (Netjeret is the feminine form of netery meaning 'godly' or 'divine', and khau, 'appearances')
- Praenomen: Maatkare, "Truth [Ma'at] is the Ka of Re"
- Nomen: Khnumt-Amun Hatshepsut, "Joined with Amun, Foremost of Noble Ladies"

=== Thutmose III ===
G5	E1 D40 N28 m S40 t O49

serekh or Horus name

G16	V29 sw t i i ra Z1 mi m Q3 X1 N1

Nebty name

G8	sxm F9 F9 D45 N28 Z3

Golden Horus name

M23 X1 L2 X1	ra mn xpr

praenomen or throne name

G39 N5	G26 ms nfr xpr Z2

nomen or birth name

Thutmose III
in hieroglyphs
Era: New Kingdom
(1550–1069 BC)

The full titulary of Eighteenth Dynasty pharaoh Thutmose III, providing a guide to pronunciation and its equivalent meaning, is as follows

- Horus name: Kanakht Khaemwaset, "Horus Mighty Bull, Arising in Thebes"
- Nebty name: Wahnesytmireempet, "He of the Two Ladies, Enduring in kingship like Re in heaven"
- Golden Horus: Sekhempahtydjeserkhaw, "Horus of Gold Powerful of strength, Sacred of appearance"
- Praenomen: Menkheperre, "He of the Sedge and the Bee, Enduring of form is Re"
- Nomen: Thutmose Neferkheperu, "Son of Ra, Thutmose, beautiful of forms"

== Bibliography ==
- Allen, James P. (1999). Middle Egyptian: An Introduction to the Language and Culture of Hieroglyphs. New York: Cambridge University Press. ISBN 978-0-521-77483-3.
- Dodson, Aidan Mark; Dyan Hilton (2004). The Complete Royal Families of Ancient Egypt. Cairo, London, and New York: The American University in Cairo Press and Thames and Hudson. ISBN 978-977-424-878-8.
- Ronald J. Leprohon (2013). The Great Name: Ancient Egyptian Royal Titulary. Society of Biblical Literature. ISBN 978-1589837355.
- Gardiner, Alan Henderson (1957). Egyptian Grammar; Being an Introduction to the Study of Hieroglyphs (3rd ed.). Oxford: Griffith Institute.
- Quirke, Stephen G. J. (1990). Who Were the Pharaohs? A History of Their Names with a List of Cartouches. London: British Museum Publications Limited.
- Schneider, Thomas (1993). "Zur Etymologie der Bezeichnung 'König von Ober- und Unterägypten'". Zeitschrift für ägyptische Sprache und Altertumskunde. 120 (2): 166–181. doi:10.1524/zaes.1993.120.2.166. S2CID 193377499.
- Shaw, Garry J. (2012). The Pharaoh, Life at Court and on Campaign. London and New York: Thames and Hudson. pp. 20–21.
- von Beckerath, Jürgen (1999). Handbuch der ägyptischen Königsnamen (2nd ed.). Mainz am Rhein: Verlag Philipp von Zabern.
