= Newborn calf (hieroglyph) =

Egyptian hieroglyph

E9
Newborn
Calf

iu
in hieroglyphs

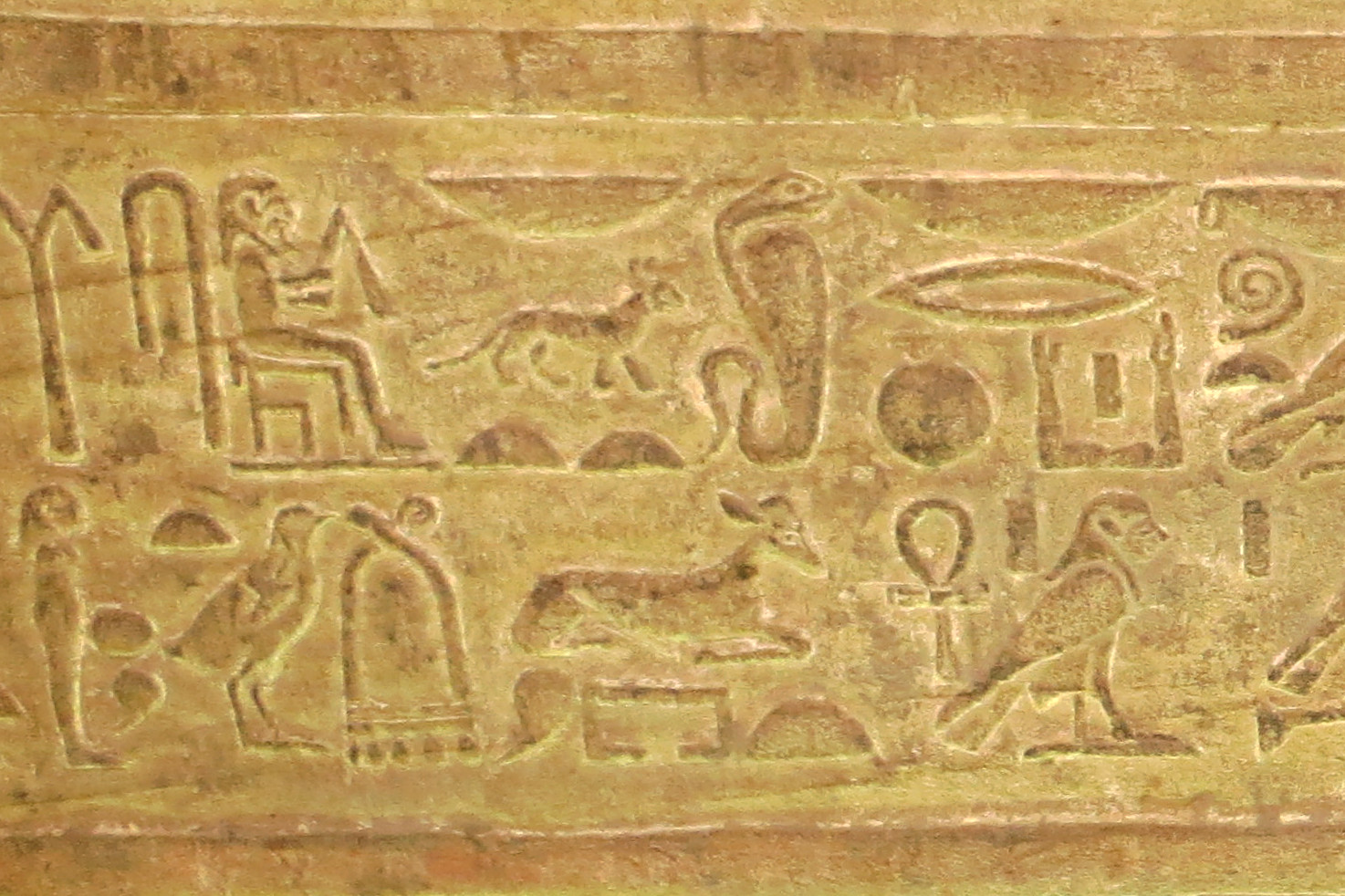
Temple relief at Edfu.

The Newborn calf (hieroglyph) is Gardiner's sign listed no. E9, in the series of mammals. The hieroglyph represents any newborn animal, and specifically the calf as the hieroglyph. In Egyptian hieroglyphs, the hieroglyph is used for the phonetic value of iu, as well as a determinative. Budge's vocabulary dictionary for the Book of the Dead has about thirty entries that start with newborn calf, "iu". They relate to conceiving, crying-out (as young creatures do), and other related items. When used with the "bone-with-meat" hieroglyph E9 F44, the reference is to heir.

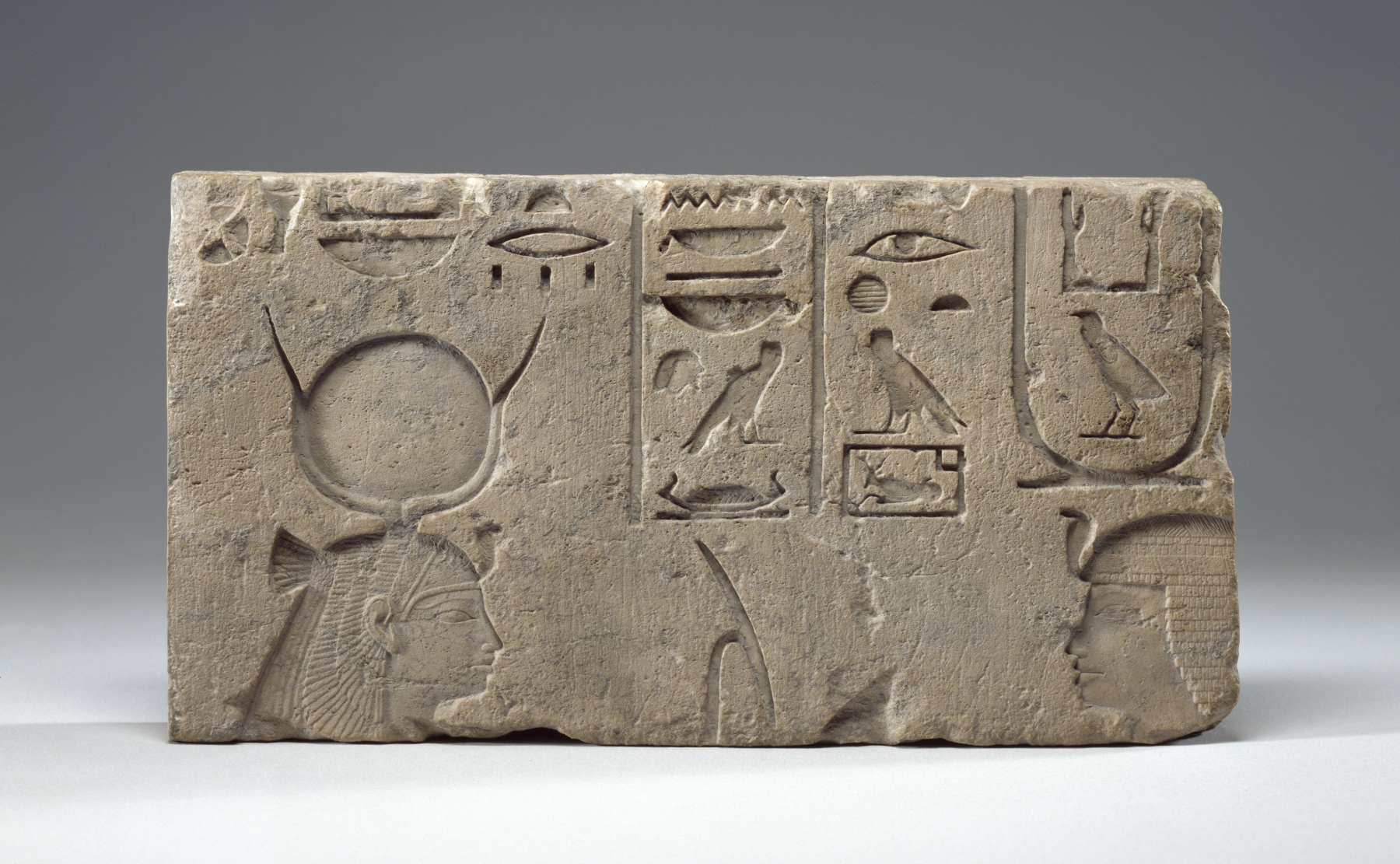
Relief at Walters Museum, with Hathor and King Necho II.

== Palermo Stone ==
In the 2390 BC Palermo Stone, the first row of year-registers (Row I of VI, on the Palermo piece of the 7–piece stone), only contains names of the first kings of the Predynastic period of the north (Nile Delta Egypt). Below each king's name is the symbol for "Pharaoh w/ (Red Crown)" A46, the "seated King, w/ Red Crown" (the King of the North, or King of the Delta, Lower Egypt). The calf is used for Pharaoh Khayu, L6 E9.

The following is the list of predynastic pharaohs (Nile Delta north) represented on the Palermo Piece of the 7–piece Palermo Stone: The sequence is in the proper order with the beginning Pharaoh on the right: (reading right-to-left, seven complete names pictured in year-registers):

- Mekh, Wazner, Neheb, Thesh, Tiu (Tiu), Khayu, Hsekiu.

G17 F32 M13 K5 N35 U14 V13 N39 X1 M17 G43 L6 E9 S29 D28
- Owl - Papyrus - Ripple - Tether - Bread&Feather - Bivalve - Cloth
- Belly - Fish - Plow - Lake - Quail - Newborn - Ka

Note: On the Palermo Stone all the hieroglyphs face in the other direction (Gardiner signs are only facing left, on the stone they face right (reading right-to-left)). The source of the following Pharaohs is only from this King List; a few have artifacts that further confirm their reign (the Double Falcon King). The pharaohs deficient in information are: Hsekiu, Khayu, Tiu (pharaoh), Thesh, Neheb, Wazner, Mekh.

== See also ==
- Gardiner's Sign List#E. Mammals
- List of Egyptian hieroglyphs
