= Pharaoh-seated, with flail & red crown (hieroglyph) =

Egyptian hieroglyph

A46
Pharaoh-
-Seated

w/Flail
& Red Crown
in hieroglyphs

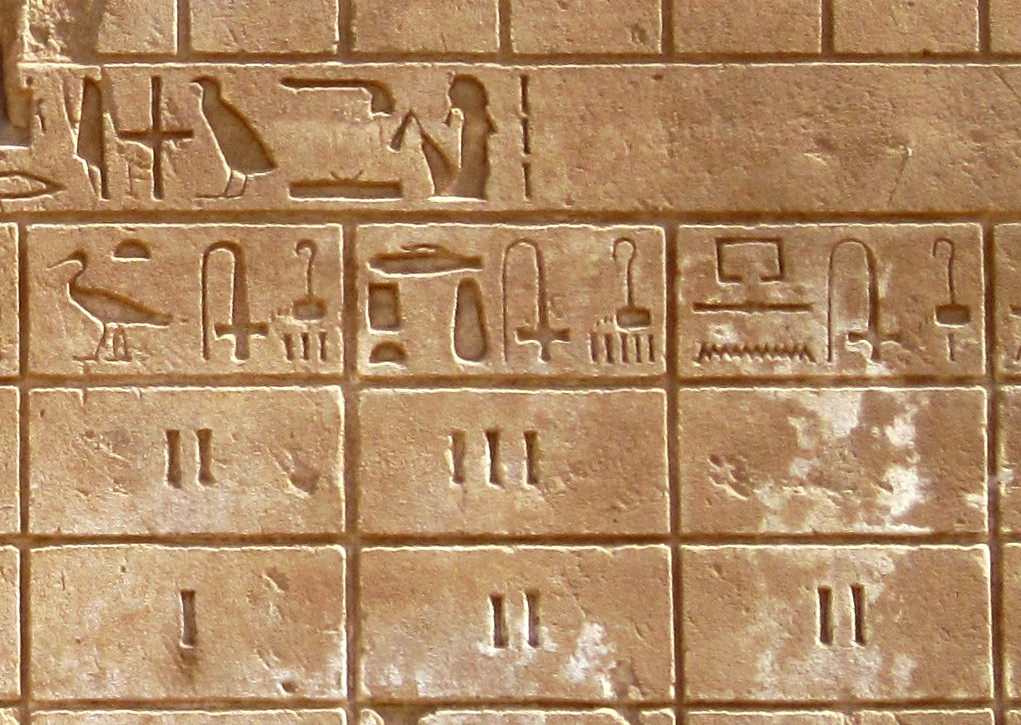
Karnak relief. (Shows flail and Blue Crown (=War Crown).) Note: beard worn by King (Pharaoh) only. A shortened beard is only worn by a Dignitary.

The Pharaoh-seated, with flail & red crown hieroglyph is Gardiner sign listed no. A46, in the category of: man and his occupations; specifically, there are many varieties in the category showing the pharaoh. The King (Pharaoh) can typically wear a variety of headgear, so all varieties have interchangeable components and subsets. The pharaoh is shown sprouting a long, 'Puntite beard', but can wear the Red Crown,

S3

the White Crown, the Double Crown, the Blue or "War Crown", or something similar. He can also be holding a Crook, a Flail,

S45

a Scepter, or other items.

== Palermo Stone, King Series, Row I (predynastic) ==
The following is the list of predynastic pharaohs (Nile Delta north) represented on the Palermo Piece of the 7–piece Palermo Stone: The sequence is in the proper order with the beginning Pharaoh on the right: (reading right-to-left, seven complete names pictured in year-registers):

- Mekh, Wazner, Neheb, Thesh, Tiu (Tiu), Khayu, Hsekiu.

G17 F32 M13 K5 N35 U14 V13 N39 X1 M17 G43 L6 E9 S29 D28

A46 A46 A46 A46 A46 A46 A46 A46

- Owl...Papyrus...Ripple......Tether...Bread&Feather.Bivalve...Cloth
- Belly.....Fish......Plow........Lake.............Quail.........Newborn...Ka

Note: On the Palermo Stone all the hieroglyphs face in the other direction (Gardiner signs are only facing left, on the stone they face right (reading right-to-left)). The source of the following Pharaohs is only from this King List; a few have artifacts that further confirm their reign (the Double Falcon King). The pharaohs deficient in information are: Hsekiu, Khayu, Tiu (pharaoh), Thesh, Neheb, Wazner, Mekh.

== See also ==
- Gardiner's Sign List#A. Man and his occupations
- List of Egyptian hieroglyphs
