= Khenti-Amentiu =

Ancient Egyptian deity

Name in hieroglyphs
E15 xnt mn tyw
- Symbol: Jackal

Khenti-Amentiu, also Khentiamentiu, Khenti-Amenti, Kenti-Amentiu and many other spellings, is an ancient Egyptian deity whose name was also used as a title for Osiris and Anubis. The name means "Foremost of the Westerners" or "Chief of the Westerners", where "Westerners" refers to the dead.

Khenti-Amentiu was depicted as a jackal-headed deity at Abydos in Upper Egypt, who stood guard over the city of the dead. Khenti-Amentiu is attested early at Abydos, perhaps even earlier than the unification of Egypt at the start of the Early Dynastic Period (c. 3100–2686 BC). The name appears on the necropolis cylinder seals for the First Dynasty pharaohs Den and Qa'a, naming each of their predecessors with the title "Horus Khenti-Amentiu", starting with "Horus Khenti-Amentiu Narmer". A temple dating to predynastic times was also founded in Abydos for this god. Toby Wilkinson suggests that, even at this early stage, Khenti-Amentiu's name may have been simply an epithet of Osiris.

The roles of Khenti-Amentiu, Osiris, and Anubis underwent considerable changes in the late Old Kingdom (c. 2686–2181 BC). Originally, only Anubis' name appeared in the offering formula that was believed to allow the dead to partake of the offerings they were given to sustain them in the afterlife. In the Fifth Dynasty (c. 2494–2345 BC), many gods started to appear in the formula, including Osiris, whose name does not appear in any texts before the start of the dynasty, and Khenti-Amentiu. In the course of the late Old Kingdom, the Khenti-Amentiu title becomes more clearly connected with Osiris.

The jackal hieroglyph that appears in Khenti-Amentiu's name in the Early Dynastic Period is traditionally seen as a determinative to indicate the god's form, but Terence DuQuesne argued that the jackal glyph represents the name of Anubis and that Khenti-Amentiu was originally an epithet or manifestation of Anubis. If this is the case, Khenti-Amentiu would have only begun to be treated as an independent deity in the Fifth Dynasty, around the same time that Osiris' name first appears. Most inscriptions from that time show Osiris and Khenti-Amentiu were already closely connected. Harold M. Hays asserted that the Pyramid Texts, whose earliest known copy only dates to the end of the Fifth Dynasty, apply the title Khenti-Amentiu to Anubis and not to Osiris, and that the Pyramid Texts reflect the beliefs of an earlier era, when Khenti-Amentiu was not fully independent of Anubis.

Beginning in the First Intermediate Period (c. 2181–2055 BC), Khenti-Amentiu's temple in Abydos was explicitly dedicated to Osiris and became his major cult center.

== See also ==
- Amenti
