= Mastaba S3035 =

Mastaba in Saqqara belonging to the First Dynasty ruler Queen Herneith

Coordinates: 29.88401432636747°N 31.218728339580984°E

Mastaba S3035 is a large mastaba tomb at the Saqqara necropolis in Lower Egypt. The burial was constructed around 3000 BC during the First Dynasty of Ancient Egypt, most likely in the reign of Den.

The mastaba (about 57,3 x 26 m) was found by Cecil Mallaby Firth who cleared parts of it in 1931. The work was not finished until Walter B. Emery took over the excavations in 1936 and published it in 1938. On many objects in the tomb appears the name of an official called Hemaka. For this reason, it is often assumed that this was his final resting place.

The burial consists of a mud brick above ground mastaba that is all around decorated with a niche facade (copying a palace facade). The mastaba above ground contains many storerooms and a lot of them were found filled with objects, especially pottery vessels. There is staircase going down to the underground burial chamber.

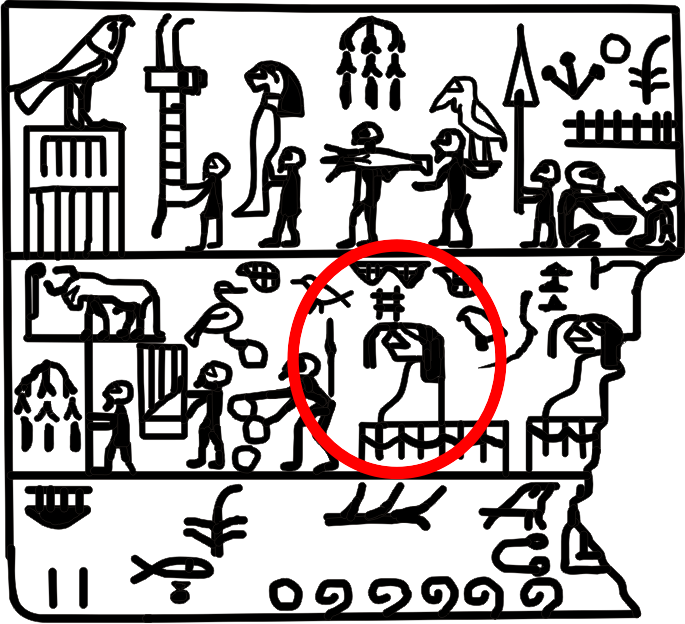
Ivory label of king Djer

The tomb was found looted but still contained many pottery and stone vessels. Many weapons were found too. Most remarkable are relief decorated stone disks, that might have been gaming pieces.

Several inscribed objects were found in the tomb. An ebony label belongs to king Djer. Many seal impressions mentioning Hemaka and king Den.

Due to the size of the tomb, Emery was wondering whether this was the burial place of king Den. However, this view was early on rejected.

== Bibliography ==
- Walter B. Emery: Excavations at Saqqara The tomb of Hemaka, Government Press, Bulaq, Cairo 1938 online
