= Den seal impressions =

First confirmed king list of ancient Egypt

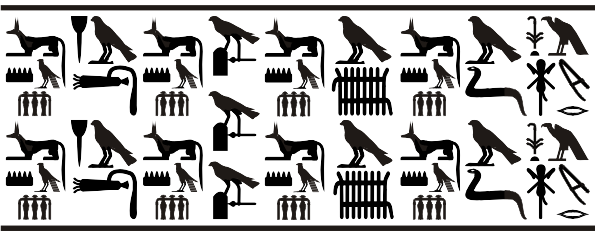
The reconstructed text of the seal. (Note: this drawing is somewhat inaccurate, as it omits the name of Den, which on the actual seal impression comes before the "king's mother Merneith" inscription, and it has a Khenti-Amentiu to the left of the name of Djet, while the actual seal impression does not. Compare with this figure.)

In 1985, the German Archaeological Institute discovered seal impressions of a cylinder seal in the tomb of First Dynasty king Den. They were published by Günter Dreyer the following year. The impressions are the earliest confirmed king list for ancient Egypt.

The names are listed in following order:

- Narmer
- Hor-Aha
- Djer
- Djet
- Den
- Merneith (Den's mother and regent)

The list bolsters the argument that Narmer was the founder of the First Dynasty as opposed to being the last of the pre-unification kings of Thinis. Also of importance is the absence of Menes as scholarly consensus believe Menes was a later variation of Narmer's name.
