= Smiting-blade symbol (hieroglyph) =

Egyptian hieroglyph

Aa7
To Smite
Strike
Beat

(sqr)
sḳr
in hieroglyphs
Era: Early Dynastic Period
(3150–2686 BC)

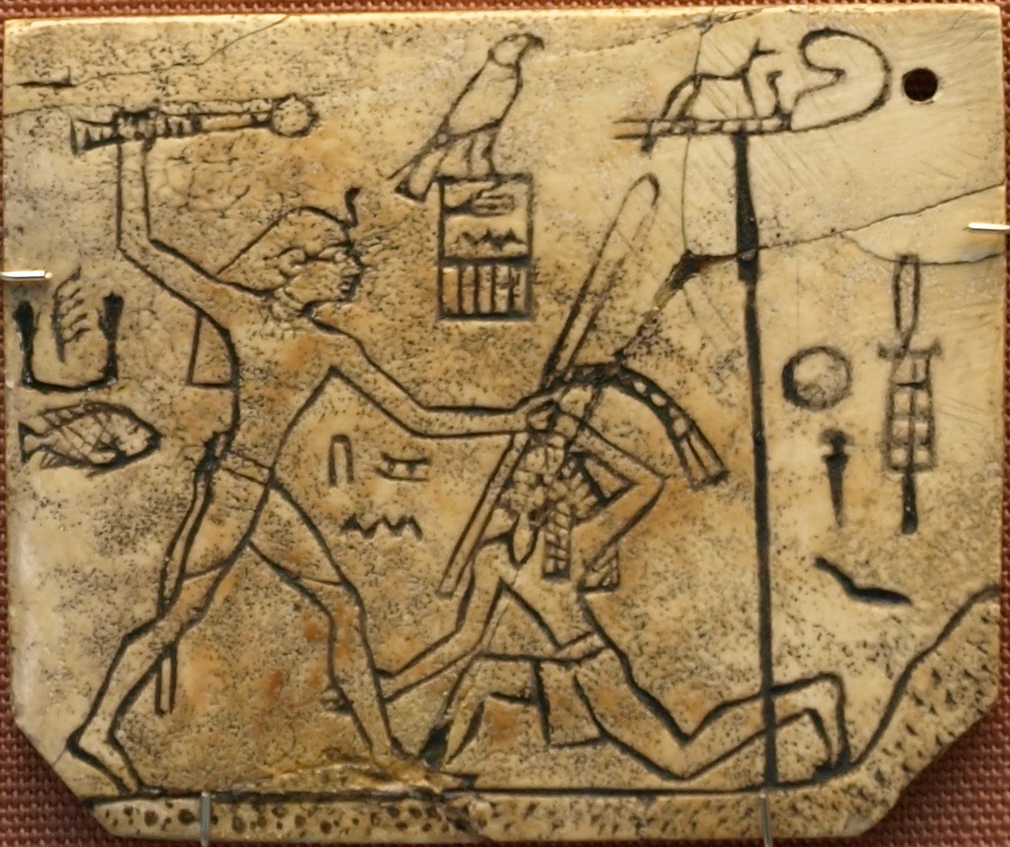
MacGregor plaque of King Den with the hieroglyphic inscription "First Time (of) Smiting the East".

The smiting-blade symbol (hieroglyph), a "horizontal blade-shape", is a symbol in Gardiner's sign list as no. Aa7, in the unclassified category. The symbol can be found in use from the First Dynasty of Egypt, for example on the MacGregor Label, one of Pharaoh Den's twenty labels (tags) found in his tomb. It is also seen on an artifact belonging to Queen Qaineit, possibly one of King Den's wives.

In the Egyptian language, the "smiting-blade symbol" has the value of sḳr (sqr). It follows the same usage of the symbol under seq, for "to smite, strike". The meaning of sqr has meanings listed as: "to beat, strike, fight, and capture prisoners".

== See also ==
- Gardiner's Sign List#Aa. Unclassified
- List of Egyptian hieroglyphs
