= Hemaka =

Ancient Egyptian official

V28 U1 D28
Ḥ-m3-k3
Hemaka
in hieroglyphs
Era: Early Dynastic Period
(3150–2686 BC)

Hemaka was an important official during the long reign of the First Dynasty Egyptian pharaoh Den. Radiocarbon dating research undertaken during the 1950s suggested a date for Hemaka's lifetime as c. 3100 BC. One of Hemaka's titles was that of "seal-bearer of the king of Lower Egypt", effectively identifying him as chancellor and second in power only to the king.

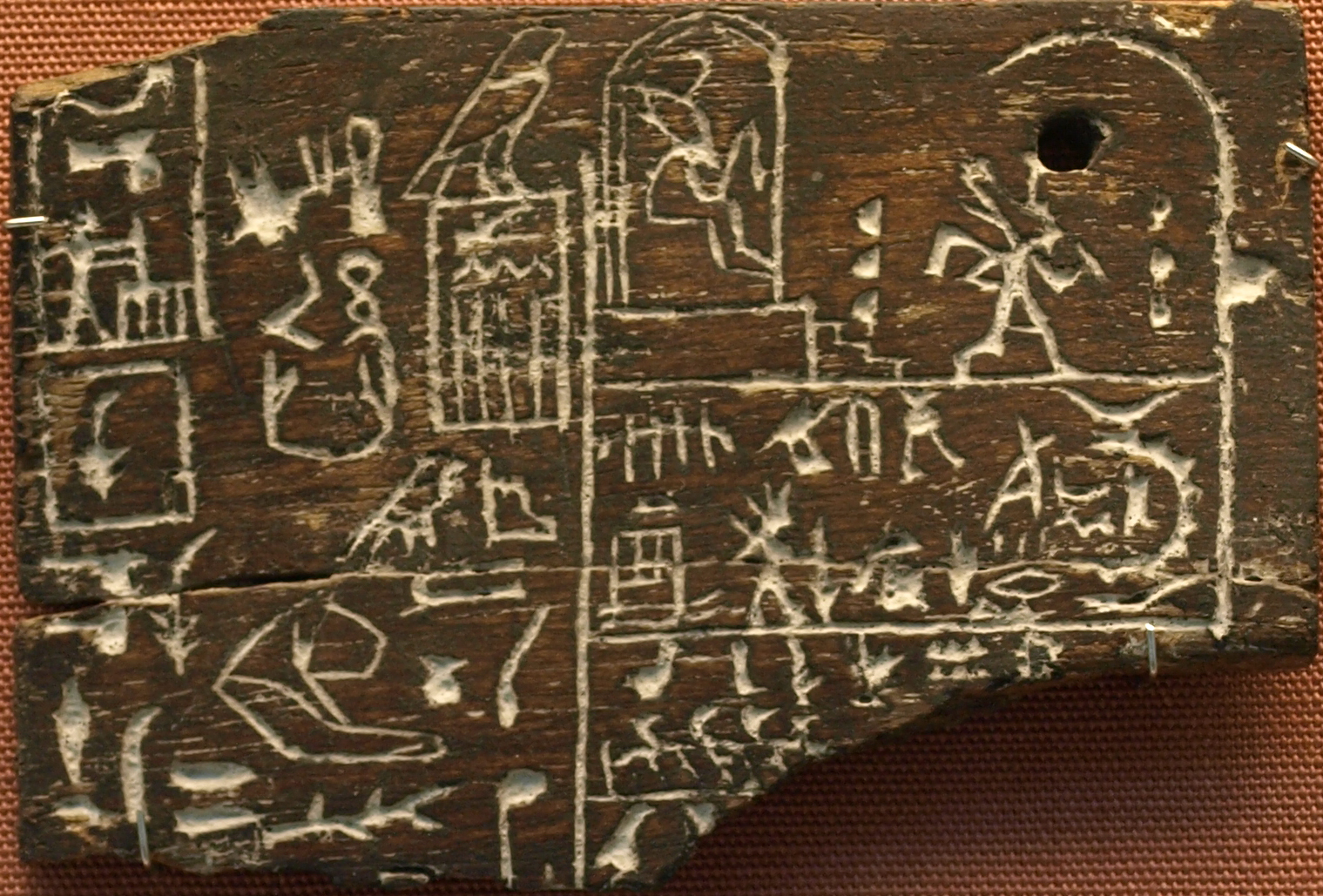
Hemaka's name and title is mentioned left of king Den's name on this year label from Den's tomb, at the Umm el-Qa'ab.

The tomb of Hemaka is larger than the king's own tomb, and for years was mistakenly thought of as belonging to Den. It was first excavated by Cecil Mallaby Firth in 1931 and work was continued under the supervision of Walter Bryan Emery starting in 1936.

This tomb, located in the northern part of Saqqara, contained many grave goods from this era, including numerous what appear to be gaming discs and a circular wooden box containing the earliest surviving piece of papyrus. The wealth of goods from this tomb as well as those of other officials from this time are thought to reflect the relative prosperity of Den's reign.

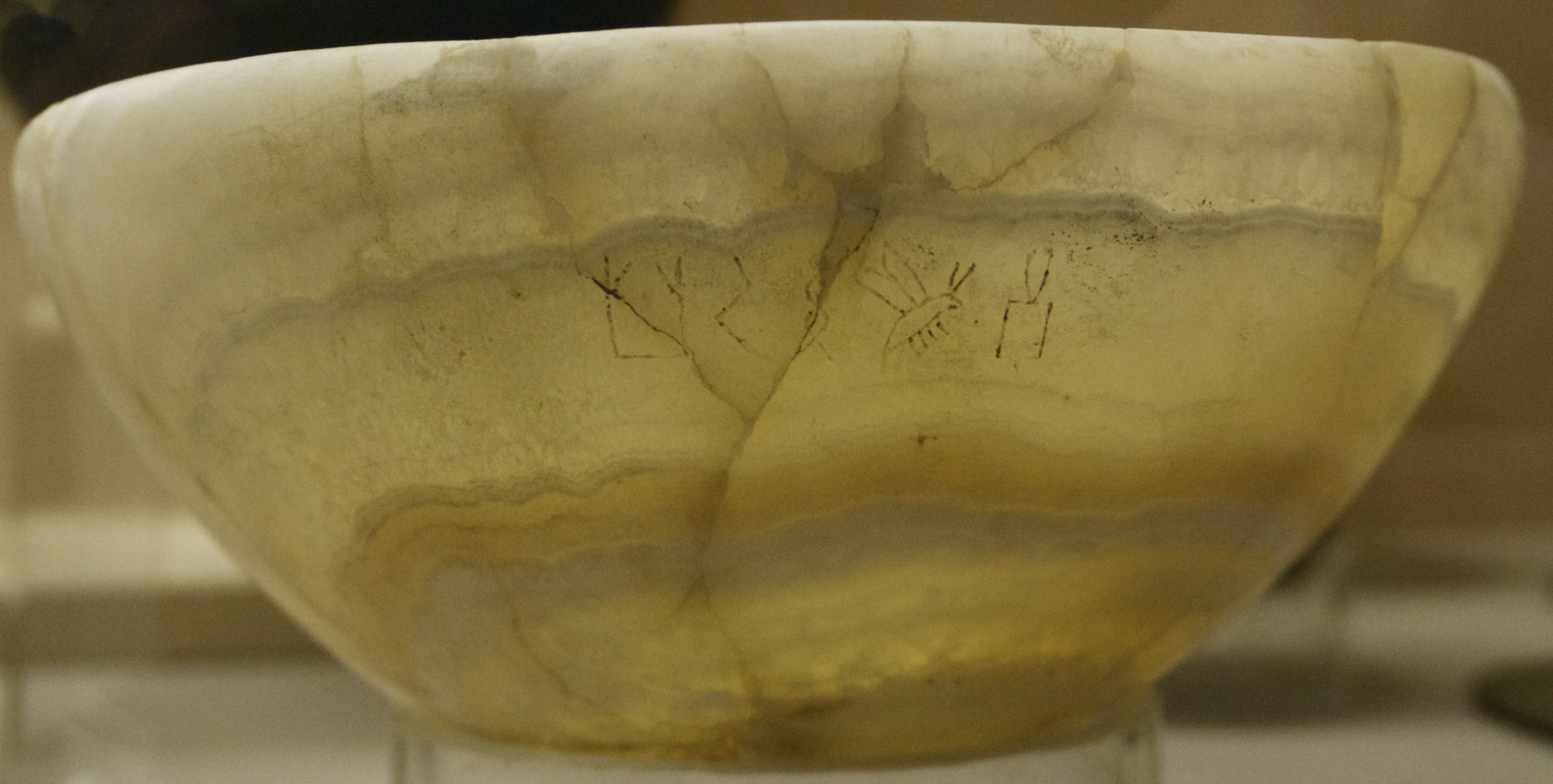
Alabaster vase bearing the name of Hemaka and his title seal-bearer of the king of Lower Egypt. National Archaeological Museum (France)

As seen from inscriptions on pottery seals, Hemaka was also responsible for maintaining one of the royal domains of king Den, a farm or vineyard for express use of the royal family and later to support the king's funerary cult. It seems likely that he began his service to the king in this position, succeeding to governing other domains until he rose to the position of chancellor.

== See also ==
- List of ancient Egyptians

== External link ==
- Disk of Hemaka found in 1936 by Walter Emery
- Disk from the tomb of Hemaka
