= Semat =

Ancient Egyptian Queen

Queen consort of Egypt
- Tenure: c. 2950 BC
- Died: c. 2950 BC
- Burial: Sohag, Egypt

Semat in hieroglyphs
F36 B1
Semat
Sm3.t
The Companion

Semat (fl. c. 2950 BC) was an Ancient Egyptian Queen, who was a wife of the King Den. She was buried near him in Abydos.

Very little is known about Semat besides a stela discovered near Den's tomb in Abydos. She held the titles of

G5 U1	E21 D36
M33.t-Ḥr.(w); Maat-Hor "She who sees Horus"	Rnm.t-Stš; Renmet-Setesh "She who carries Seth"

Both of these titles were associated with queens in ancient Egypt. Semat was not the only woman identified from funerary stela. Other women whose funerary stela were found near Den's tomb are Seshemetka and Serethor.

The stela was in the Egyptian Museum of Berlin, but was destroyed during World War 2.
