= MacGregor plaque =

Egyptian Plaque

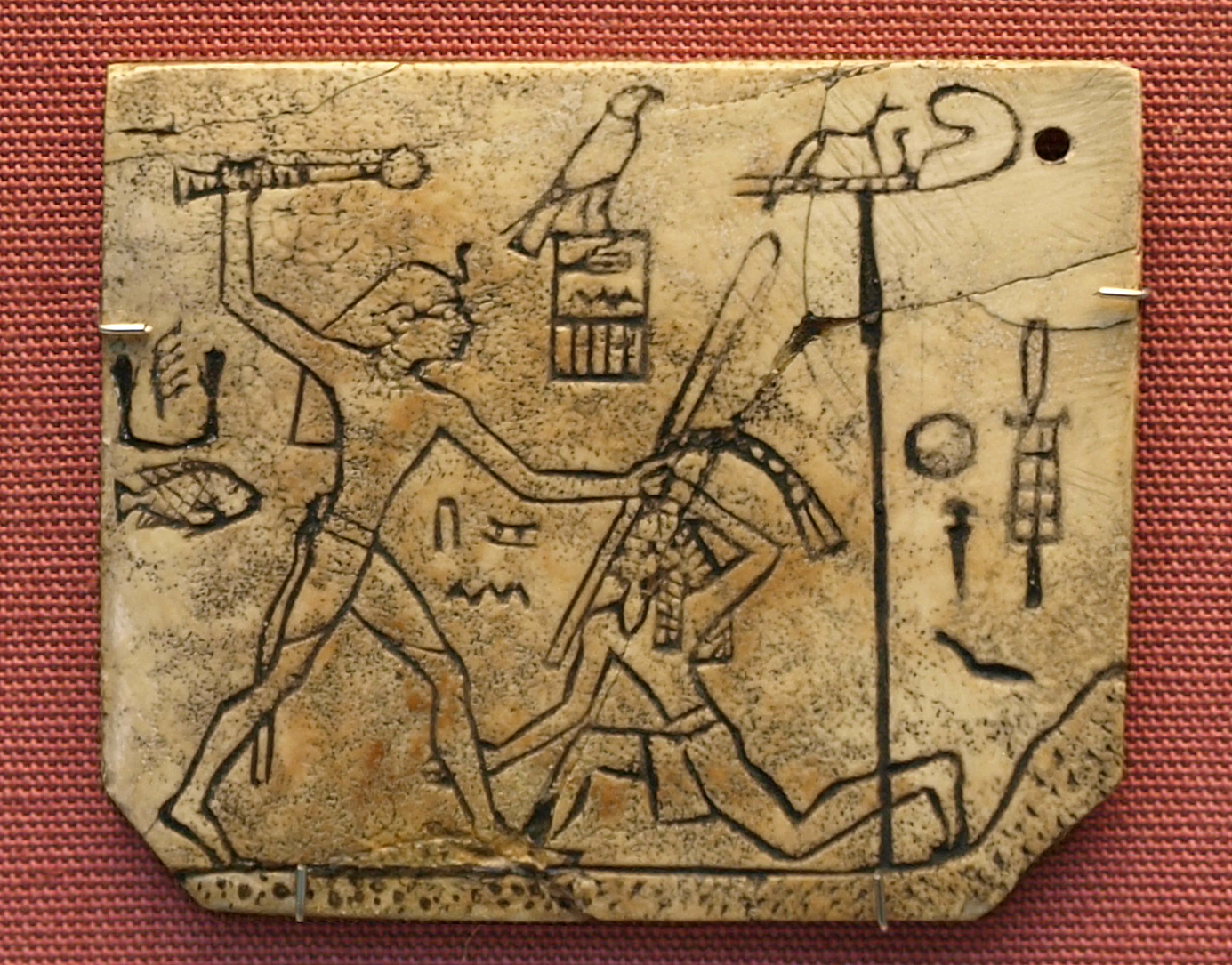
- The MacGregor plate, found in Abydos, and dated circa 2985 BCE. British Museum.
- Material: Ivory
- Created: ca. 2985 BCE
- Discovered: Abydos, 26.185°N 31.918889°E

Location
- Location of Abydos in Egypt.

The MacGregor Plaque (or MacGregor Tablet, also King Den's sandal label) is an artefact that was probably found in the tomb of King Den at Abydos, and dated circa 2985 BCE. According to its inscriptions, the plaque was originally attached to the king's sandal. The plaque is displayed in the British Museum.

It is, with the depictions of Narmer, among the oldest images of a ruler.

== Origin and description ==
The MacGregor Plaque is a tablet is made of carved ivory that measures 4.5 cm x 5.4 cm; it is about 0.2 cm thick. Images are engraved and fired into it. The artefact was probably found in the mastaba tomb of the ancient Egyptian king Den (First Dynasty), and dated circa 2985 BCE. It derives from the excavations of French archaeologist, Coptologist, and Egyptologist Émile Amélineau. The artefact is also known as MacGregor Tablet, also King Den's sandal label.

The plaque was acquired by the British Museum in 1922; before that it, was part of the MacGregor collection, collected by Reverend William MacGregor from Liverpool. The plaque is displayed in the British Museum with the inventory number BM EA 55586.

=== Front side ===
On the front side, King Den is depicted. He wears a loincloth, a khat head-dress with a Uraeus-snake, and an animal tail which hangs down from the back of his skirt. Den is labelled with his Horus name. His pose belongs to the motif of the "slaying the enemy": the king has his right hand raised, holding a mace; with his left hand, Den holds an enemy in place with his hair. The enemy is already on his knees, but attempts to ward off the king's blow. He can be identified as an Asiatic on account of his hairstyle (goatee and braids).

Along the plaque we find a hieroglyphic inscription, with a left to right reading direction: "I was the one who completed the first strike to the east," accompanied by the jackal standard of the god Wepwawet. This inscription tells us that King Den himself conducted his first victory against the easterners. The fact that it is very important to state that it is the "first victory" is telling us that more battles will come, that other battles were lost, and that other first dynasty kings were engaged in protecting and expanding Egypt's frontiers and territories: from Nubia with the A-group to the Easterners in the north. In the Palermo stone, in its third row that it is considered to belong to Horus Den, appears in the second register "Smiting the bedouins", that it could refer to this label, but with all likelihood it refers to subsequent campaigns, since this one happened in the second half of Den's reign.

This plaque is the earliest attestation for the long head-dress known as the khat. Horus Den is also the first king known to display the double crown, indicating us that he was an innovative and active developer of royal iconography.

=== Back side ===
On the other side of the plaque, a pair of sandals are depicted, although the left part is severely damaged by abrasion. According to its inscriptions, the plaque was originally attached to the king's sandal.

== Cultural impact ==
The artifact appeared in A History of the World in 100 Objects.

== Bibliography ==
- Wolfgang Helck. Untersuchungen zur Thinitenzeit (= Ägyptologische Abhandlungen. Vol. 45). Harrassowitz, Wiesbaden 1987, ISBN 3-447-02677-4, S. 161 & 187.
- R. B. Parkinson, Whitfield Diffie, Mary Fischer, R. S. Simpson. Cracking codes: the Rosetta stone and decipherment. Vol. 2. California Press, New York 1999, ISBN 0520222482, p. 74.
- A. J. Spencer. Early Dynastic Objects (= Catalogue of the Egyptian Antiquities in the British Museum.). British Museum, London 1980, ISBN 0-7141-0927-4, p. 65, No. 460.

Preceded by 10: Jōmon pottery	A History of the World in 100 Objects; Object 11	Succeeded by 12: Standard of Ur
