= Water-jugs-in-stand (hieroglyph) =

Egyptian hieroglyph

W17 W18
Water jugs
in stand
in hieroglyphs

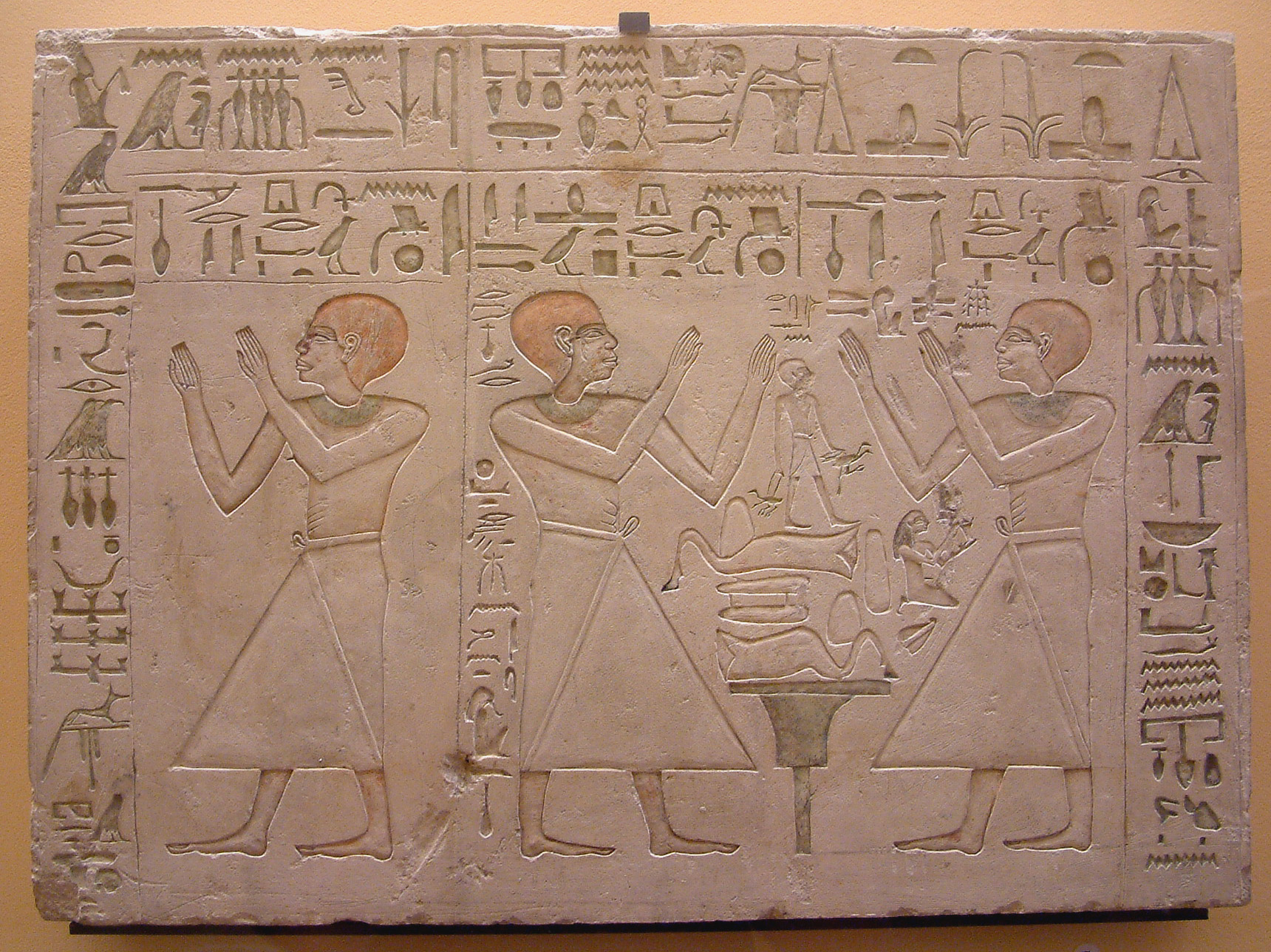
Relief with 3- and 4-jug hieroglyphs.

The ancient Egyptian Water-jugs-in-stand hieroglyph, is Gardiner sign listed no. W17, W18, within the Gardiner signs for vessels of stone and earthenware.

The hieroglyph is used as an ideogram in (kh)nt-(ḫnt), for 'a stand (for vases)'. It is also used phonetically for (ḫnt).

== Egyptian "khenti" ==
The water-jugs-in-stand hieroglyph is often written with the complement of three other hieroglyphs, the water ripple, N35, bread bun, X1, and two strokes, Z4, to make the Egyptian language word foremost, khenti. The complete composition block is: W17 N35 X1 Z4

As Egyptian "khenti", foremost is used extensively to refer to gods, often in charge of a region, or position, as foremost of xxxx. Anubis, or Osiris are often referred to as "Foremost", or "Chief" of the 'western cemetery', (where the sun sets).

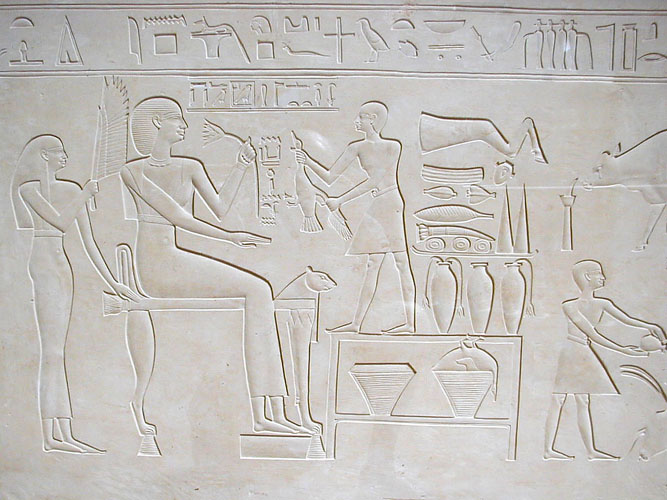
Relief from the limestone sarcophagus of Ashayet, 11th Dynasty

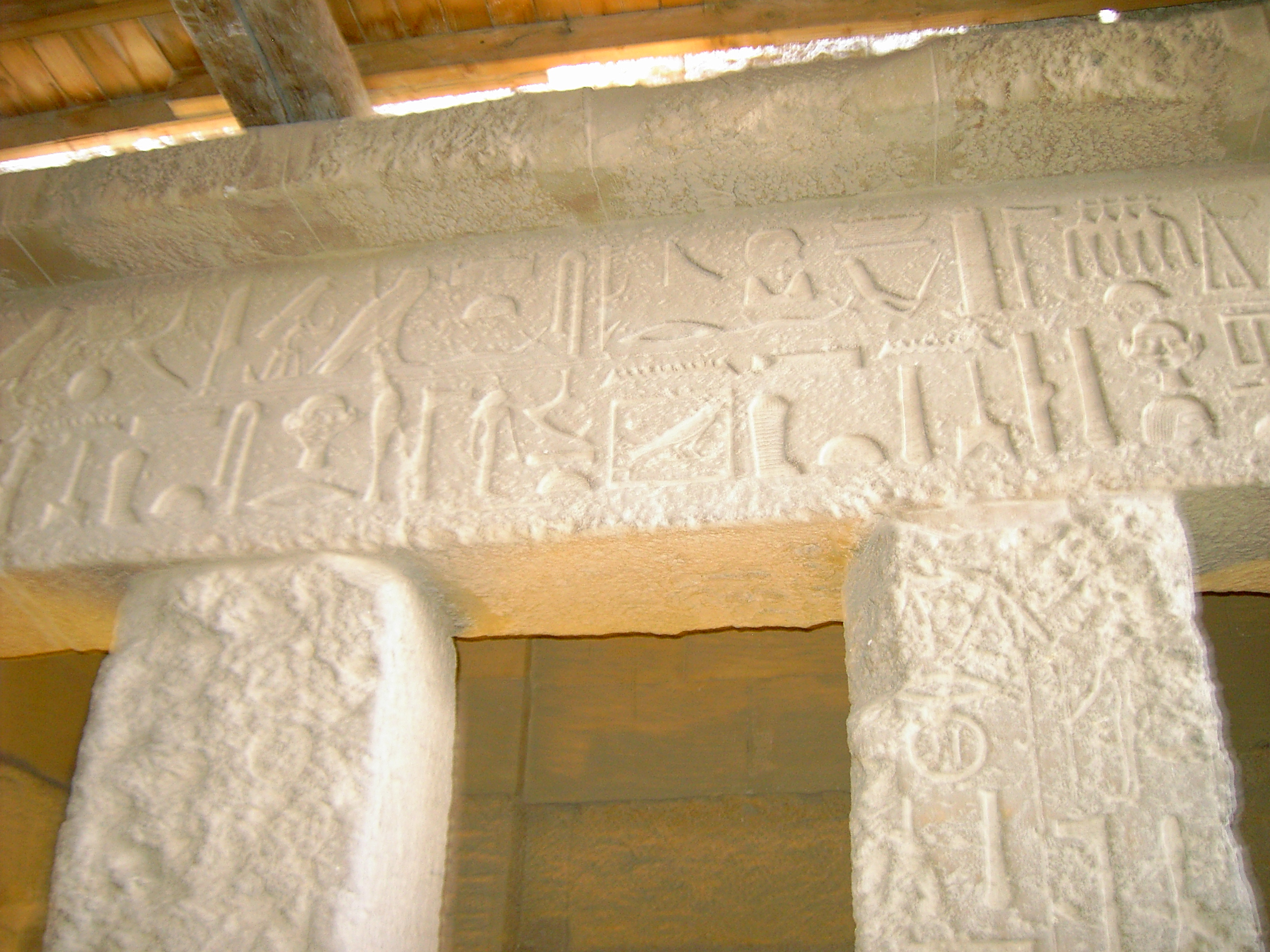
Giza

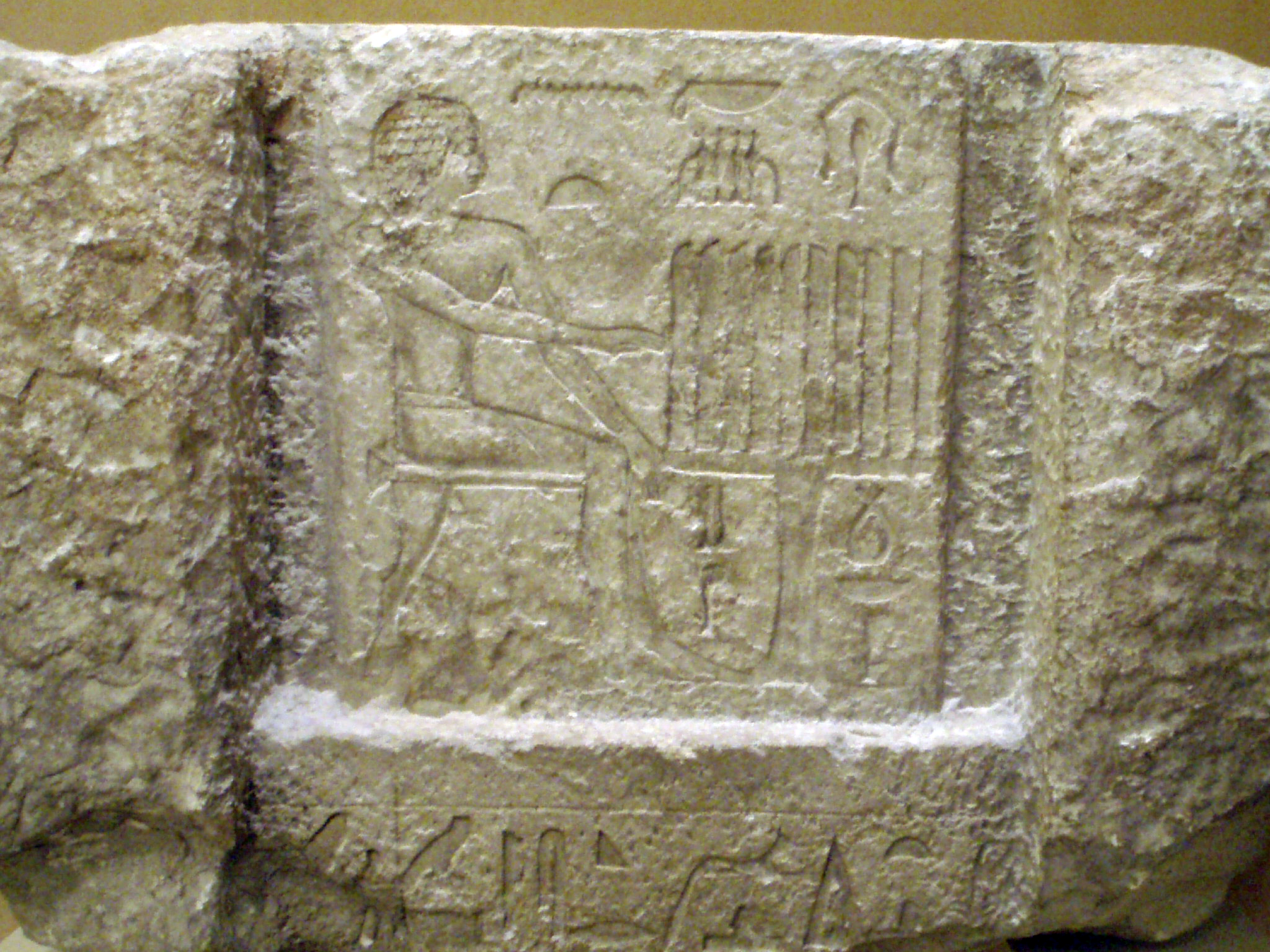
Relief

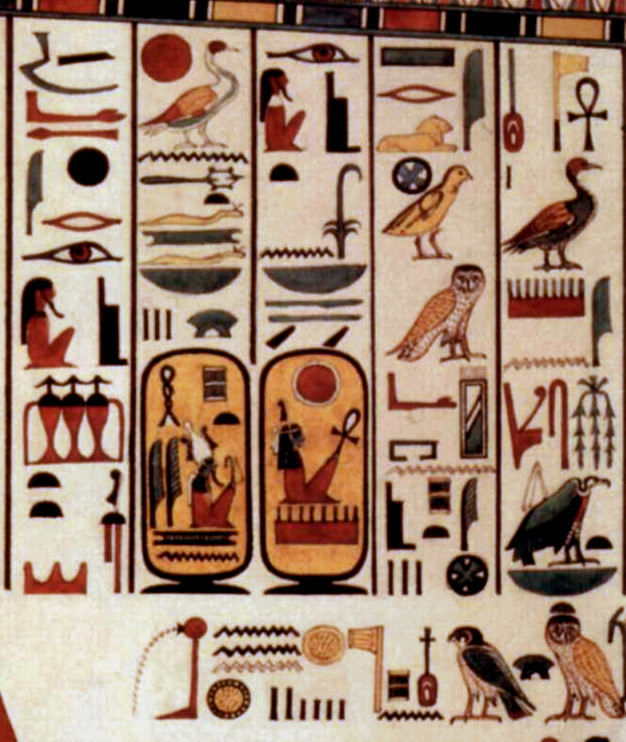
Painted Relief

== See also ==
- Gardiner's Sign List#W. Vessels of Stone and Earthenware
- Smiting-blade symbol (hieroglyph)
