= Seshemetka =

Ancient Egyptian queen

Seshemetka in hieroglyphs
sSm t kA
Seshemetka (Seshemet ka)
Sšm.t kꜣ
(She) who led the Ka

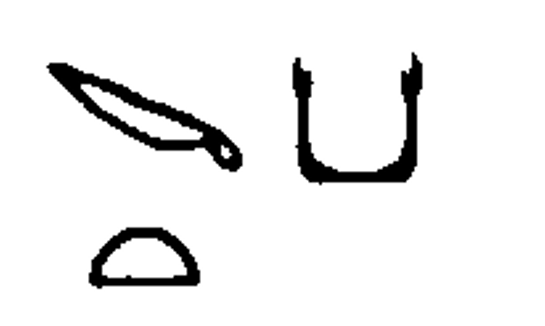
Seshemetka in hieroglyphics

Seshemetka was an ancient Egyptian queen from the First Dynasty of Egypt, a wife of pharaoh Den. Her royal titles were Great one of the hetes-sceptre (Weret-hetes, Wr.t-ḥts), She who sees Horus (Remen-Hor(u), Rmn-Ḥr.(w)), She who carries Seth (Renmet-Setesh, Rnm.t-Stš).

Very little is known about Seshemetka besides a stela discovered near Den's tomb in Abydos. Seshemetka was not the only woman identified from funerary stela. Stelae of royal women named Semat and Serethor were similarly discovered in Abydos. These women may be further wives of king Den, but nothing beyond their names is known about them.

Wolfram Grajetzki (referencing Petrie, Troy, and Roth) lists Seshemetka as a wife of King Djer and states that she was buried near Djer's funerary complex in Umm el-Qa'ab, Abydos.
