= Palermo Stone =

Fragment of a stele known as the Royal Annals of the Old Kingdom of Ancient Egypt

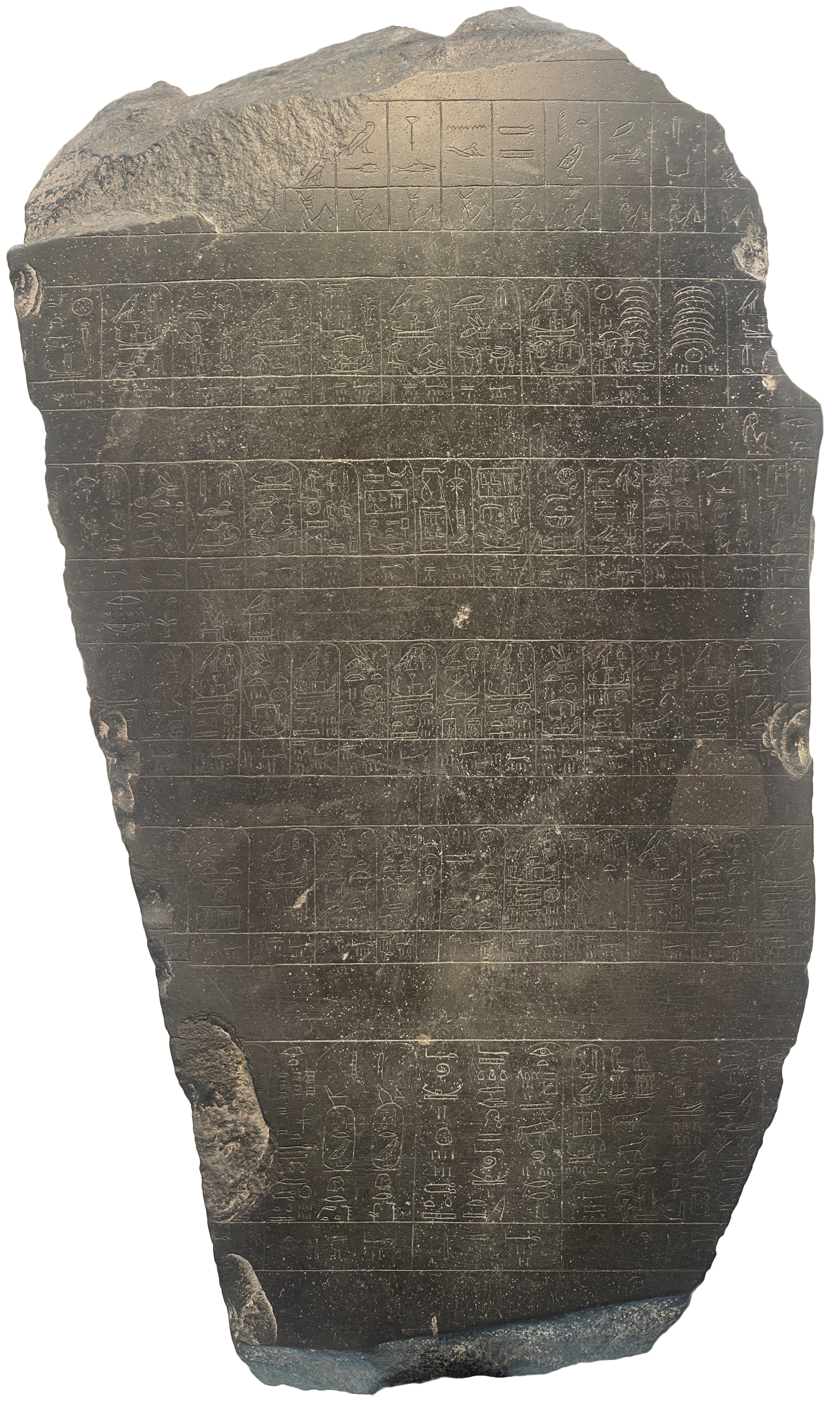
- The Palermo Stone, the fragment of the Egyptian Royal Annals housed in Palermo, Italy
- Height: 43.5 cm
- Width: 25 cm
- Created: c. 2450 BC
- Discovered: before 1859
- Present location: Antonino Salinas Regional Archaeological Museum

The Palermo Stone is one of seven surviving fragments of a stele known as the Royal Annals of the Old Kingdom of Ancient Egypt. The stele contained a list of the kings of Egypt from the First Dynasty (c. 3150–2890 BC) through to the early part of the Fifth Dynasty (c. 2498–2345 BC) and noted significant events in each year of their reigns. It was probably made during the Fifth Dynasty. The Palermo Stone is held in the Regional Archeological Museum Antonio Salinas in the city of Palermo, Italy, from which it derives its name.

The Palermo Stone and other fragments of the Royal Annals preserve what is probably the oldest historical text that has survived from Ancient Egypt and form a key source for Egyptian history in the Old Kingdom.

== Description ==
The Royal Annals stele, of which the Palermo Stone formed part, may originally have been about 60 cm high and 2.1m wide. The fragments are composed of a compact hard black stone, probably a form of basalt.

The Palermo Stone itself is an irregular shield-shaped fragment, 43.5 cm high, 25 cm wide and 6.5 cm thick (maximum dimensions).

The inscription on the "front" (recto) of the Palermo Stone consists of six horizontal bands or registers of hieroglyphic text running right to left. The first register lists the names of predynastic kings of Lower Egypt (identified as such by the wearing of the Red Crown). The second and subsequent registers contain portions of royal annals for pharaohs of the First to Fourth Dynasties, that is lists of the key events in each year of the reign of each king, arranged chronologically. The second register on the Palermo Stone begins with the final year entries for a king of the First Dynasty whose name is not preserved, but who is generally assumed to be either Narmer or Aha. The rest of the second register is taken up with the first nine annual entries for this king's successor, who is again not named on the fragment, but is assumed to be either Aha or his successor Djer. The remainder of the inscription on this side continues with royal annals down to the kings of the Fourth Dynasty.

The text continues on the "back" (verso) of the Palermo Stone, cataloguing events during the reigns of pharaohs down to Neferirkare Kakai, third ruler of the Fifth Dynasty. From the surviving fragments, it is unclear whether the Royal Annals originally continued beyond this point in time. Where a king is named, the name of his mother is also recorded, such as Betrest mother of the First Dynasty king Semerkhet and Meresankh I mother of the Fourth Dynasty king Seneferu.

Information recorded in the Royal Annals (as preserved on the Palermo Stone) includes measurements of the height of the annual Nile flood (see Nilometer), the inundation, details of festivals (such as Sed festivals), taxation, sculpture, buildings, and warfare.

== Archaeological history ==
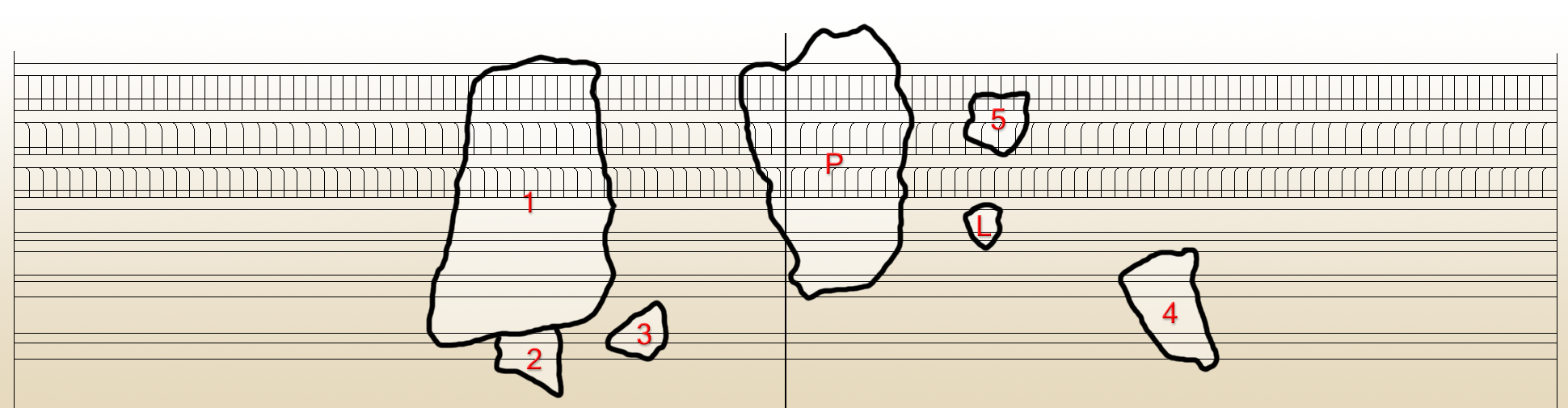
The Royal Annals of Egypt, showing a suggested reconstruction of the stele and the positions of the seven surviving fragments. P is the Palermo Stone, nos. 1-5 are the Cairo fragments, and L is the London fragment

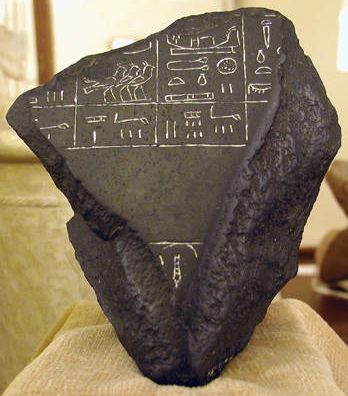
A fragment of the Royal Annals, on display at the Petrie Museum, London, which is inscribed with part of the Khasekhemwy register and at the bottom with a sign from the Sneferu register

The original location of the stele is unknown and none of the surviving fragments have a secure archeological provenance. One fragment now in Cairo is said to have been found at an archaeological site at Memphis, while three other fragments now in Cairo were said to have been found in Middle Egypt. No find site for the Palermo Stone itself has been suggested.

The Palermo Stone was purchased by a Sicilian lawyer, Ferdinand Guidano, in 1859 and it has been in Palermo since 1866. On 19 October 1877, it was presented to the Palermo Archaeological Museum by the Guidano family, where it has remained since.

There are five fragments of the Royal Annals in the Egyptian Museum in Cairo, four of which were acquired between 1895 and 1914. The fifth was purchased on the antiquities market in 1963. One small fragment is in the Petrie Museum of University College London, forming part of the collection of the archeologist Sir Flinders Petrie (and purchased by him in 1914).

The importance of the Palermo Stone was not recognized until it was noticed by a visiting French archaeologist in 1895. The first full publication and translation was that done in 1902 by Heinrich Schäfer.

== Uncertainties ==
There are uncertainties regarding the date of the Palermo Stone and of the Royal Annals it records. It is unknown whether the inscription was done all at once or whether it was added to over time. It is also unknown whether or not it dates from the latest period it describes (i.e. from no later than the Fifth Dynasty). It has been suggested that the stele was made much later, perhaps in the Twenty-fifth Dynasty (747–656 BC). Even if the Royal Annals, as preserved by the Palermo Stone and other fragments, were not carved during, or soon after, the period they describe, they are directly based on an Old Kingdom original.

It is also unknown whether all the surviving fragments are parts of the same stele or whether they come from separate copies. None of the smaller fragments held in Cairo have any clear provenance, and they may not all be genuine.

Various parts of the ancient text are in widely varying states of preservation, which makes the text difficult to decipher. If the text is a later copy, rather than a Fifth Dynasty original, errors and invention may have crept in during the copying process.

== Significance ==
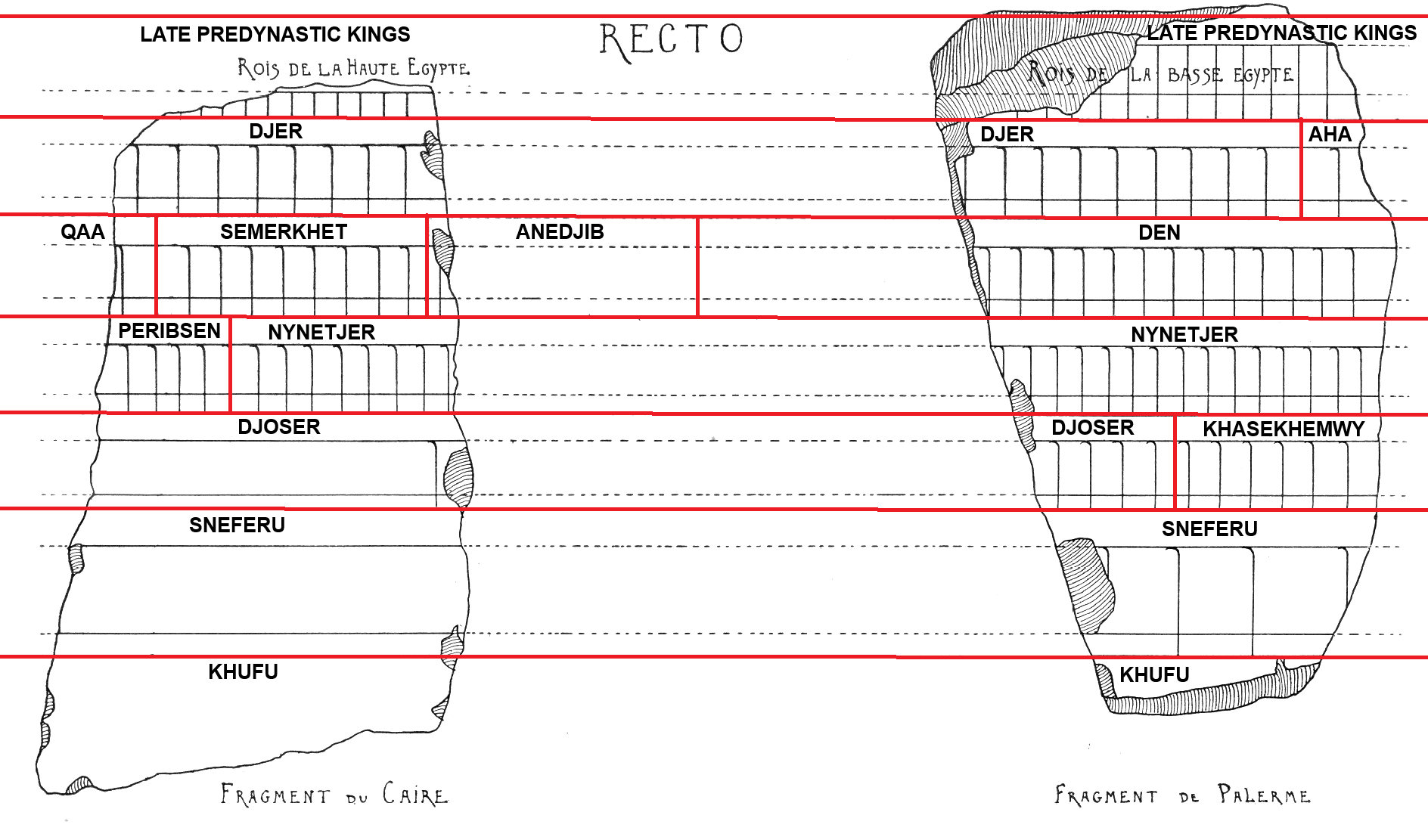

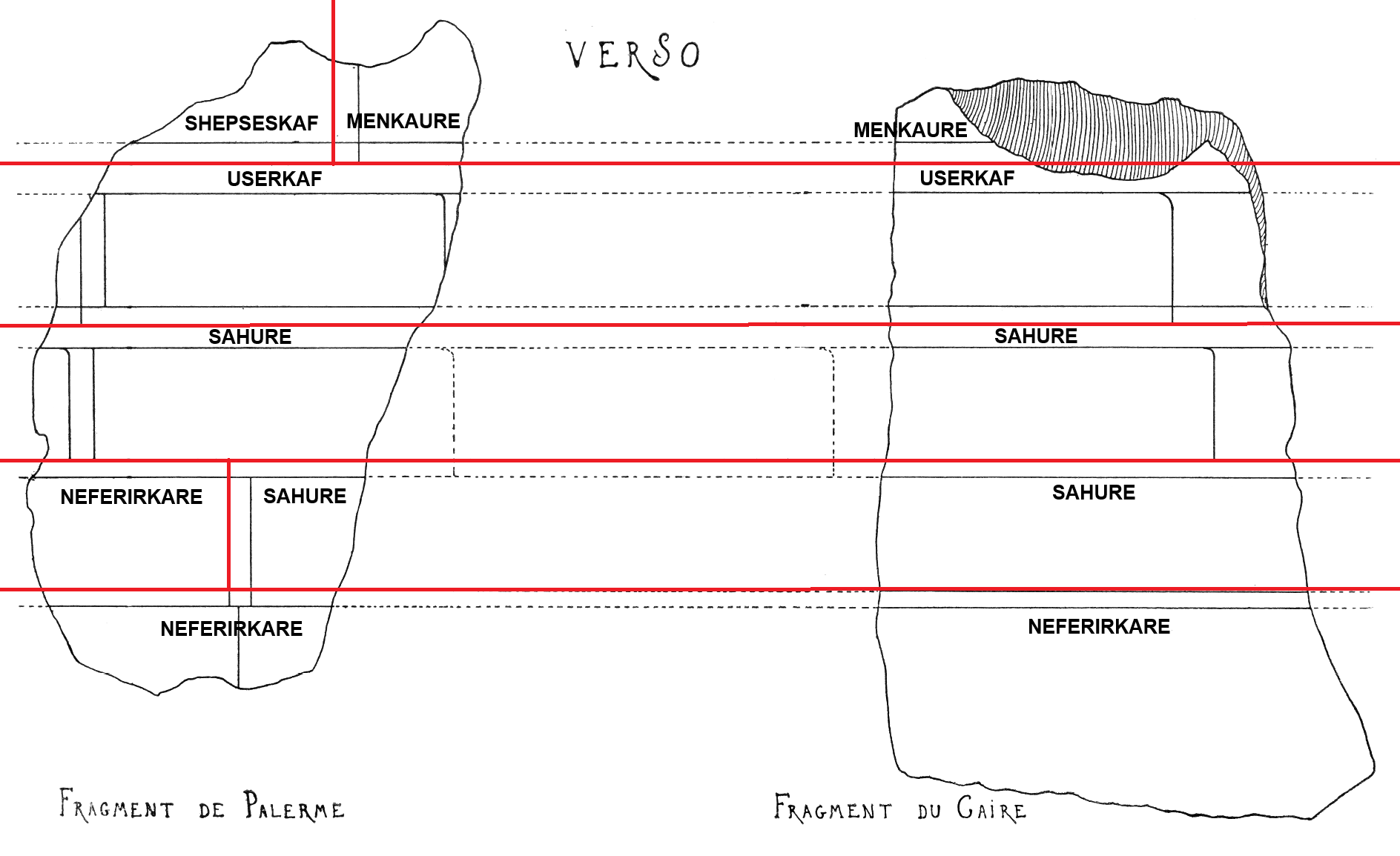
Names and positions of Pharaohs on Cairo Fragment 1 and the Palermo Stone from the front and back.

The Palermo Stone and the other associated fragments of the Royal Annals are vital sources for the history of the Old Kingdom, as they preserve names of members of the royal families during the first five dynasties, which are not otherwise recorded.

The surviving Royal Annals fragments contains the names of the following pharaohs:

- Djer (1st dynasty).
- Den (1st dynasty).
- Semerkhet (1st dynasty). His full reign is preserved on Cairo Fragment 1.
- Nynetjer (2nd dynasty).
- Peribsen (2nd dynasty), unlike other pharaohs who have Horus on their serekh, Peribsen has Seth on it.
- Khasekhemwy (2nd dynasty), his serekh has both Horus and Seth on it, likely to commemorate his achievement of reunifying Egypt.
- Djoser (3rd dynasty), known for his step pyramid, which is the earliest colossal stone building in ancient Egypt. Also, reverted to having only Horus on his serekh.
- Huni (3rd dynasty).
- Sneferu (4th dynasty).
- Khufu (4th dynasty), builder of the Great Pyramid of Giza.
- Djedefre (4th dynasty), first pharaoh using the sun symbol in a royal cartouche.
- Shepseskaf (4th dynasty)
- Userkaf (5th dynasty), founder of the 5th dynasty.
- Sahure (5th dynasty)
- Neferirkare Kakai (5th dynasty)

In addition, while the names of Hor-Aha (1st dynasty), Anedjib (1st dynasty), Qa'a (1st dynasty), and Menkaure (4th dynasty) have not survived, their positions can still be inferred based on their surviving registers.

The New Kingdom Egyptian king lists, such as the Turin Canon (13th century BC) and the Abydos king list (reign of Seti I, 1294–1279 BC), identify Menes (probably Narmer) (c. 3100 or 3000 BC) as the first king of the First Dynasty and so credit him with unifying Egypt. However, the top register of the Royal Annals names some predynastic rulers of Upper and Lower Egypt, presumably referring to a time before Egypt was unified. Identification of these kings with historical persons remains controversial. The ancient historian Manetho may have used information similar to the complete Royal Annals stele to construct his chronology of the early dynasties of Egypt, forming part of his Aegyptiaca (History of Egypt), written during the third century BC, although the surviving king list most closely related to his work (as preserved by later ancient and later writers) is the Turin Canon.

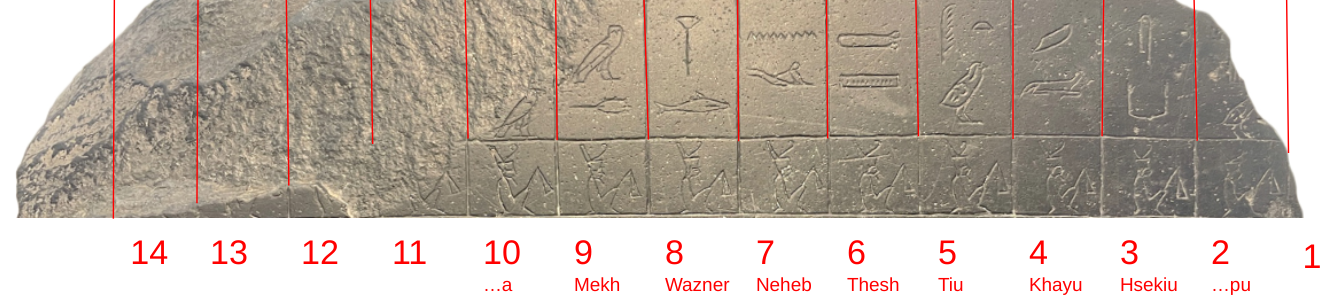
List of Pre-Dynastic Pharaohs on the Palermo Stone

The Palermo stone also mentions at least fourteen predynastic pharaohs from Lower Egypt by their Horus name, of which at least five whose names have been fully destroyed. These may be mythical kings preserved through oral tradition, or may even be completely fictitious.

#	Name	Transliteration	Hieroglyphs
1.	Name destroyed		
2.	[…]pu	[…p]w	HASH w A46
3.	Hsekiu or Seka	skꜣ	s kA A46
4.	Khayu or Khaiu	ḫꜣjw	L6 E9 A46
5.	Tiu or Teyew	tjw	t i w A46
6.	Thesh, Tjesh or Tesh	ṯš	T N39 A46
7.	Neheb or Niheb	n-hb	n hb A46
8.	Wazner, Wazenez, Wadjenedj, Wadj-adj, or Wenegbu	wꜣḏ-ꜥḏ	wAD K2 A46
9.	Mekh or Mekhet	mẖ(t)	m X A46
10.	[…]a	[…]ꜣ	HASH A A46
11.	Names destroyed		
12.	Names destroyed		
13.	Names destroyed		
14.	Names destroyed		

== See also ==
- List of pharaohs
- Saqqara Tablet
- South Saqqara Stone

== Sources ==
- Partial and dated English translation of the text in J.H. Breasted, (1906). Ancient Records of Egypt, vol. I, sections 76–167. Chicago: University of Chicago Press.
- Nuzzolo, Massimiliano (2021), The Palermo Stone and Its Associated Fragments: New Discoveries on the Oldest Royal Annals of Ancient Egypt, The Journal of Egyptian Archaeology Vol. 107(1-2) 2021, pp.57–78
- St. John, Michael (1999). The Palermo Stone: An Arithmetical View. London: University Bookshop Publications.ISBN 0-9536-8650-7
- Wilkinson, Toby A. H. (2000). Royal Annals of Ancient Egypt. New York: Columbia University Press. ISBN 0-7103-0667-9. Short Preview
- Wilkinson, Toby A. H. (1999). Early Dynastic Egypt. London: Routledge. ISBN 0-203-02438-9.
- O'Mara, P.F. (1979). The Palermo Stone and the Archaic Kings of Egypt. Calif: Paulette Pub. Co, 113-131.
