= Hsekiu =

Egyptian Pharaoh

- Seka
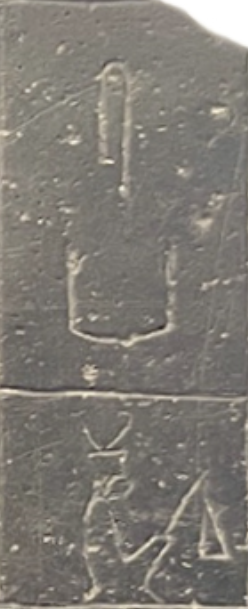
- Hsekiu's name on the Palermo Stone

Pharaoh
- Predecessor: ...pu
- Successor: Khayu
Royal titulary
Horus name
Hsekiu s kA
- Dynasty: Predynastic Period

Hsekiu, or Seka, was a predynastic Lower Egyptian Pharaoh who ruled over the Nile Delta. He is mentioned in the Palermo Stone as the third ruler of Lower Egypt. There is no archeological evidence of him, which leads most archeologists to think of him as mythical.

== See also ==
- Palermo Stone
- List of pharaohs
