= Khayu =

Predynastic Lower Egyptian Pharaoh

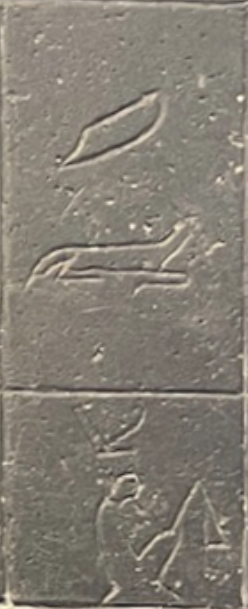
- Khayu's name on the Palermo Stone

Pharaoh
- Reign: 4th millennium BC
- Predecessor: Hsekiu
- Successor: Tiu
Royal titulary
Horus name
Khayu
Ḫꜣjw
L6 E9
- Dynasty: Predynastic Period

Khayu, or Khaiu, was a predynastic pharaoh of Lower Egypt who is mentioned as the fourth ruler on the Palermo Stone. As there is no other evidence of such a ruler, he may be a mythical king preserved through oral tradition, or may even be completely fictitious.
