= Den (pharaoh) =

Horus name of an early Egyptian king

- Udimu, Dewen
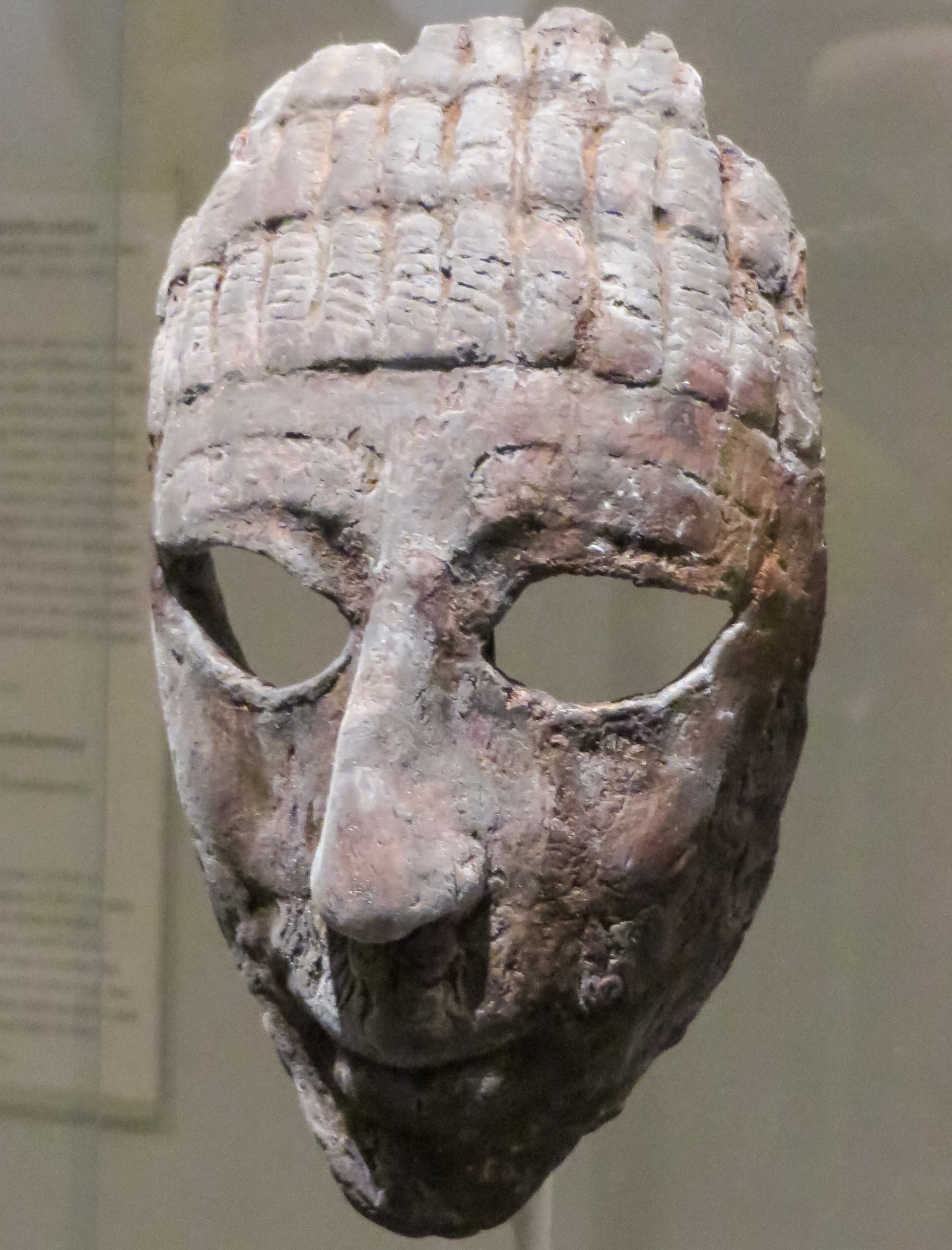
- Depiction of Den from a composite statue found within Tomb T at Umm el-Qa'ab (now in Museum of Fine Arts, Boston)

Pharaoh
- Reign: 42 years, starting c. 2970 BC
- Coregency: Merneith
- Predecessor: Djet, Merneith
- Successor: Anedjib
Royal titulary
Horus name
Hor-Den
Ḥr-dn
He who brings the waters for Horus
G5	D46 n
Golden Horus
Iaret-nebu-shen
jˁr.t-nbw-šn
Golden cobra
I12 S12 V9
Prenomen
Nisut-Bity-Khasty
nsw.t-bjtj-ḫ3st.j
King of Upper and Lower Egypt, he of the two deserts
M23 t L2 t N25 N25 t
Abydos King List
Sepati
sp3t.j
He of the two districts
< N24 N24 >
Turin King List
Qenenti
Qnntj
< Aa8 X1 Z4 > G7
- Consorts: Seshemetka, Semat, Serethor, Nakht-Neith ? Qua-Neith ?
- Children: Anedjib ?
- Father: Djet
- Mother: Merneith
- Burial: Tomb T, Umm El Qa'ab
- Dynasty: 1st Dynasty

Den, also known as Hor-Den, Dewen, and Udimu, was the Horus name of a king of the Early Dynastic Period who ruled during the First Dynasty of Egypt. He is the best archaeologically-attested ruler of this period, credited with bringing prosperity to his realm.

Den was attributed the title "King of Upper and Lower Egypt" and wore the double crown (red and white). Notably, the floor of his tomb at Umm El Qa'ab, near Abydos, was constructed using red and black granite, making it the earliest known use of this hard stone as a building material in Egypt with a flight of stairs leading to it. During his long reign, he established many of the customs of court ritual and royalty drawn on by later rulers and was held in high regard by his immediate successors.

== Length of reign ==
The Ancient Egyptian historian Manetho called him “Oúsaphaîdos” and credited him with a reign of 20 years, whilst the Royal Canon of Turin is damaged and therefore unable to provide information about the duration of Den's reign. Egyptologists and historians generally believe that Den had a reign of 42 years, based on inscriptions on the Palermo Stone.

Recent radiocarbon data from the tombs at Abu Rawash, datable to the reign of Den, provide likely estimate for the Den's accession to 3011–2921 BC (1σ).

== Name sources ==
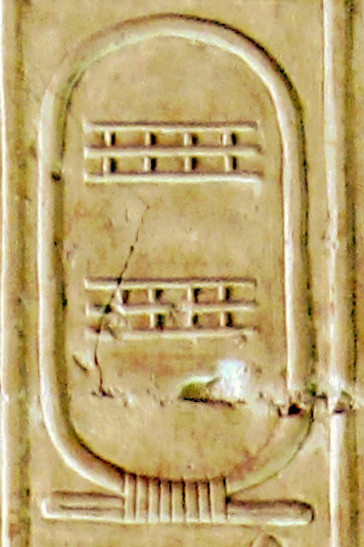
Sepati, cartouche name of Den in the Abydos king list.

Den's serekh name is well attested on earthen seal impressions, on ivory labels and in inscriptions on vessels made of schist, diorite and marble. The artifacts were found at Abydos, Saqqara and Abu Rawash. Den's name is also attested in later documents. For example, the Medical Papyrus of Berlin (the Ramesside era) discusses several methods of treatment and therapies for a number of different diseases. Some of these methods are said to originate from the reign of Den, but this statement may merely be trying to make the medical advice sound traditional and authoritative. Similarly, Den is mentioned in the Papyrus of Ani (also dated to Ramesside times) in chapter 64.

== Identity ==
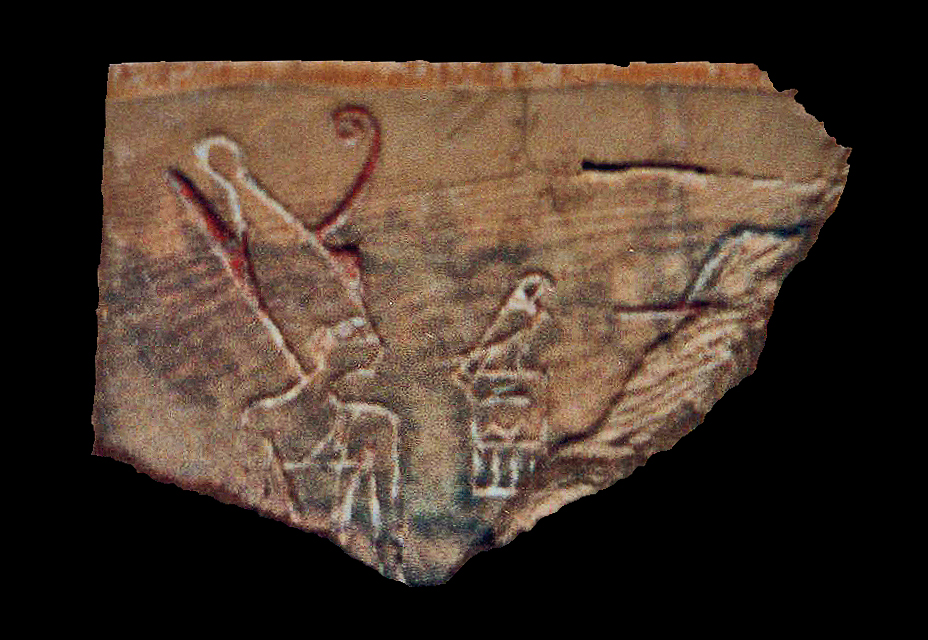
Fragment of an ivory label showing pharaoh Den wearing the double crown of Upper and Lower Egypt. Discovered in the tomb of Den, now in the Egyptian Museum.

Den's serekh name was "Den" or "Dewen", most likely meaning "he who brings the waters". This is consistent with his birth name, which was “Khasty”, meaning “he of the two deserts”. Egyptologists such as Toby Wilkinson and Francesco Tiradritti think that the birth name refers to the eastern and the western desert – both surrounding Egypt like protective shields – or to Lower and Upper Egypt. This is in accord with the introduction of the Nisut-Bity-title by Den. This royal title was designed to legitimise the ruler's power over the whole of Egypt.

Den's family has been the subject of significant research. His mother was queen Merneith; this conclusion is supported by contemporary seal impressions and by the inscription on the Palermo Stone. Den's wives were the queens Semat, Seshemet-ka, Serethor, and, possibly, Qaineit (or Qua-Neith). He also had numerous sons and daughters; his possible successors could have been king Anedjib and king Semerkhet.

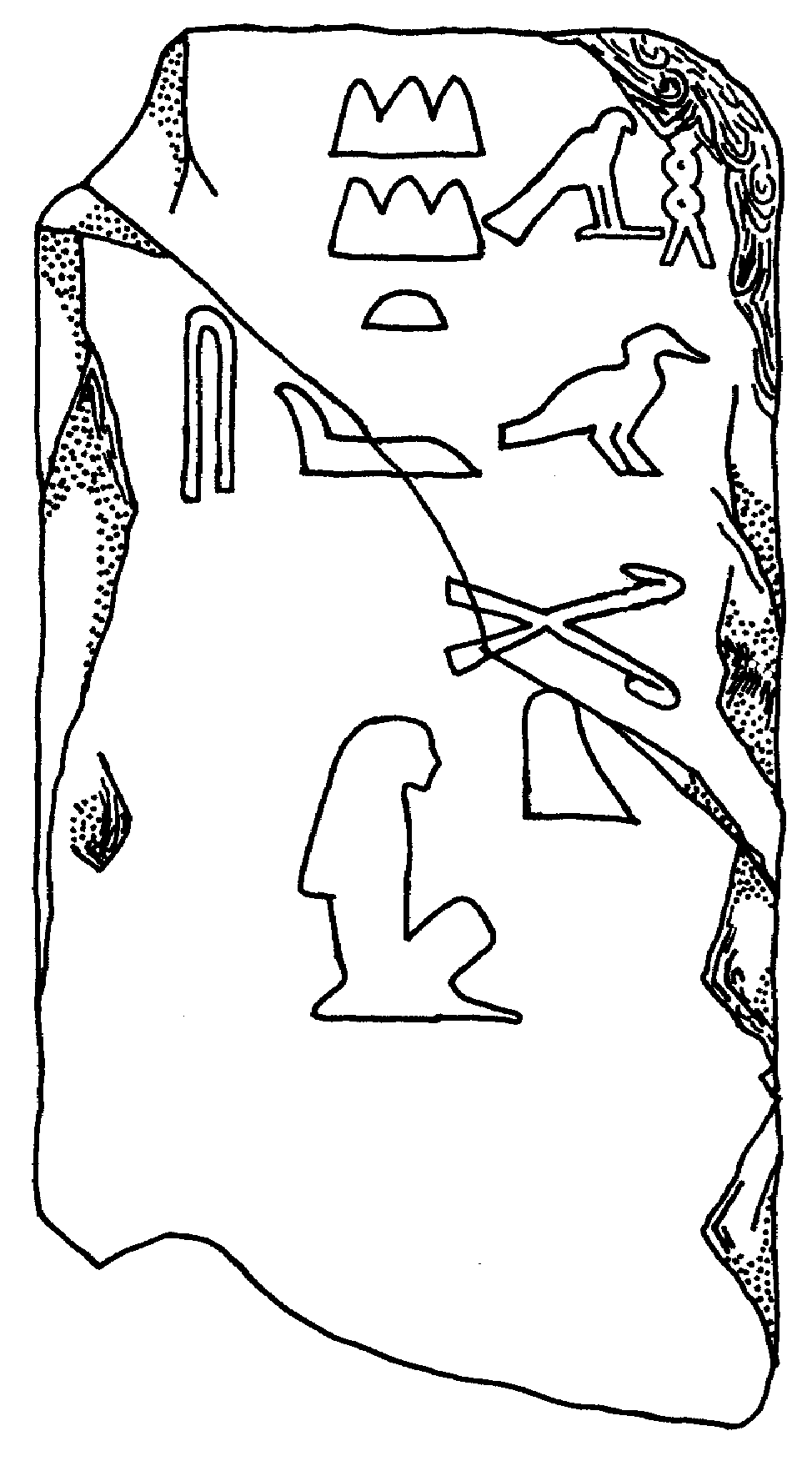
Stele of Qaineit, possibly a wife of Den

Den's Royal Household is also well researched. Subsidiary tombs and palatial mastabas at Sakkara belonged to high officials such as Ipka, Ankh-ka, Hemaka, Nebitka, Amka, Iny-ka and Ka-Za. In a subsidiary tomb at Den's necropolis, the rare stela of a dwarf named Ser-Inpu was found.

The birth name of Den was misread in Ramesside times. The Abydos King List has "Sepati" written with two symbols for "district". This derives from the two desert symbols Den originally had used. The Turin King List refers to "Qenenti", which is quite difficult to translate. The origin of the hieroglyphs used the Royal Canon of Turin remains unknown. The Saqqara Tablet mysteriously omits Den completely.

== Reign ==
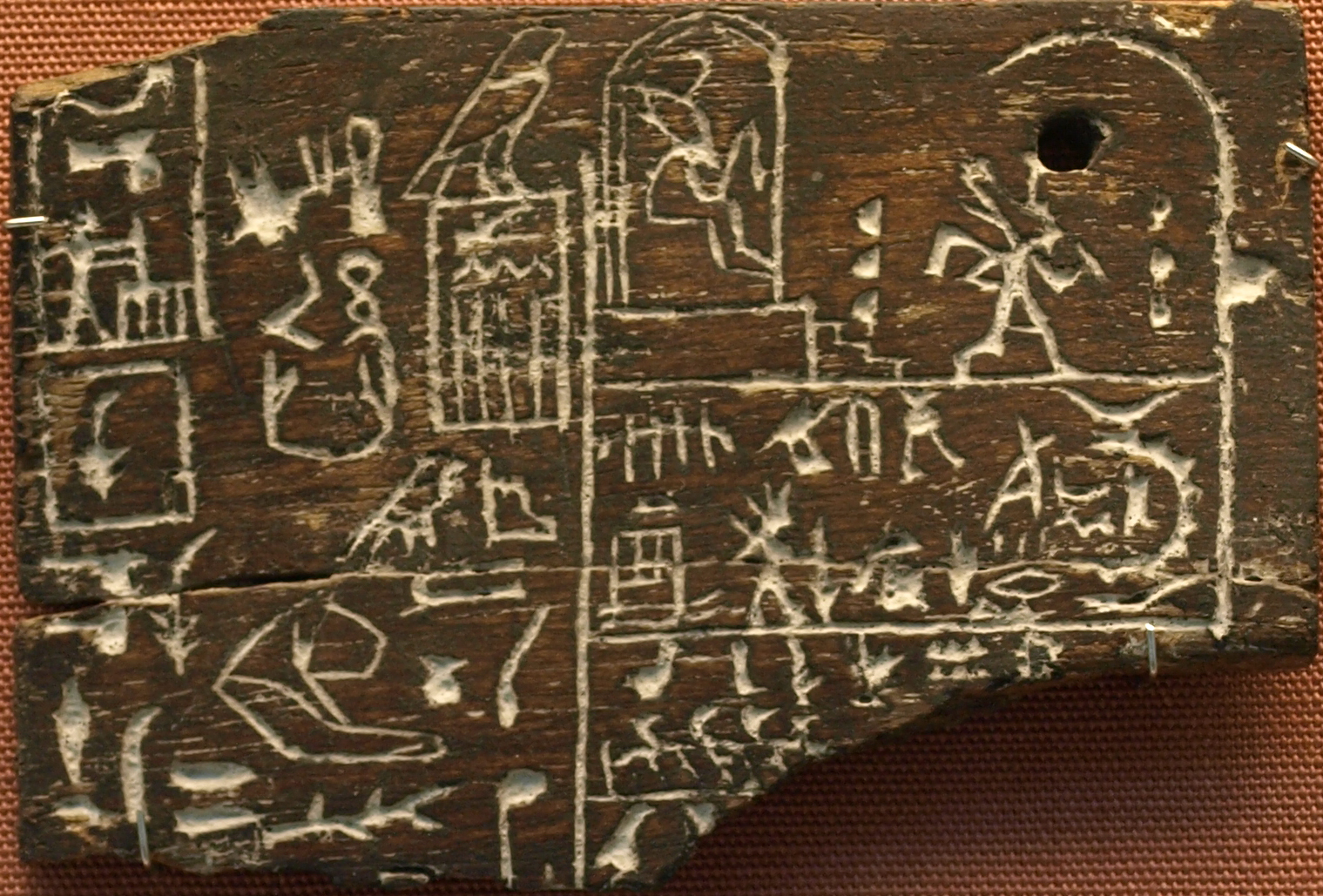
Ebony label EA 32650 from Den's tomb, now in the British Museum. The upper right register depicts king Den twice: at the left he is sitting in his Hebsed pavilion, at the right he is running a symbolic race around D-shaped markings. This ceremony is connected to the so-called "race of the Apis bull". The middle right section reports about the raid of the city "beautiful door" and about a daughter of Den suffering from an unknown disease. The lower right section reports about the visitation of the "souls of Peh" at the royal domain "Wenet". The left part of the label describes the content of the vessel that once belonged to the label and mentions the high official Hemaka, who was obviously responsible for the delivery of the labeled jar.

=== Beginning ===
According to archaeological records, at the very beginning of his reign, Den had to share the throne with his mother Meritneith for several years. It seems that he was too young to rule himself. Therefore, Meritneith reigned as a regent or de facto pharaoh for some time. Such a course of action was not unusual in ancient Egyptian history. Queen Neithhotep may have taken on a similar role before Meritneith, while queens such as Sobekneferu and Hatshepsut were later female Egyptian rulers. Den's mother was rewarded with her own tomb of royal dimensions and with her own mortuary cult.

=== Events ===
An important innovation during Den's reign was the introduction of numbering using hieroglyphs. Prior to this, important year events were merely depicted in signs and miniatures, sometimes guided by the hieroglyphic sign rnpt "bald palm panicle", meaning “year”. From Den's reign onwards, the Egyptians used numbering hieroglyphs for a range of purposes including calculating tax collections and for annotating their year events.

Den is the first Egyptian king attested with rock reliefs in the Sinai Peninsula. Two or perhaps even three reliefs are showing the standing king and some of his officials.

Most religious and political happenings from Den's reign are recorded in the numerous ivory tags and the Palermo Stone inscription. The tags show important developments in typography and arts. The surface is artistically parted into sections, each of them showing individual events. For example, one of these tags reports on an epidemic then affecting Egypt. The inscription shows the figure of a shaman with an undefined vessel or urn at his feet. A nearby inscription begins with “Henu...” but it is unclear, if that means “provision” or if it is the first syllable of the name “Henu-Ka” (a high official).

Another tag, known as the “MacGregor Label”, shows the first complete depiction of an Egyptian king with the so-called nemes headdress. The picture shows Den in a gesture known as "smiting the enemy". In one hand Den holds a mace, in the other hand he grabs a foe by his hair. Thanks to the braids and the conic beard the foe has been identified as of Asian origin. The hieroglyphs at the right side say "first smiting of the east". At the left side the name of the high official Iny-Ka is inscribed. It seems that Den sent troops to the Sinai Peninsula and the eastern desert a number of times. Plundering nomads, known by the early Egyptians as jwntj.w "people with hunting bows”, were regular foes of Egypt, often causing trouble. They are again mentioned in a rock inscription in the Sinai Peninsula under Semerkhet, one of Den's successors.

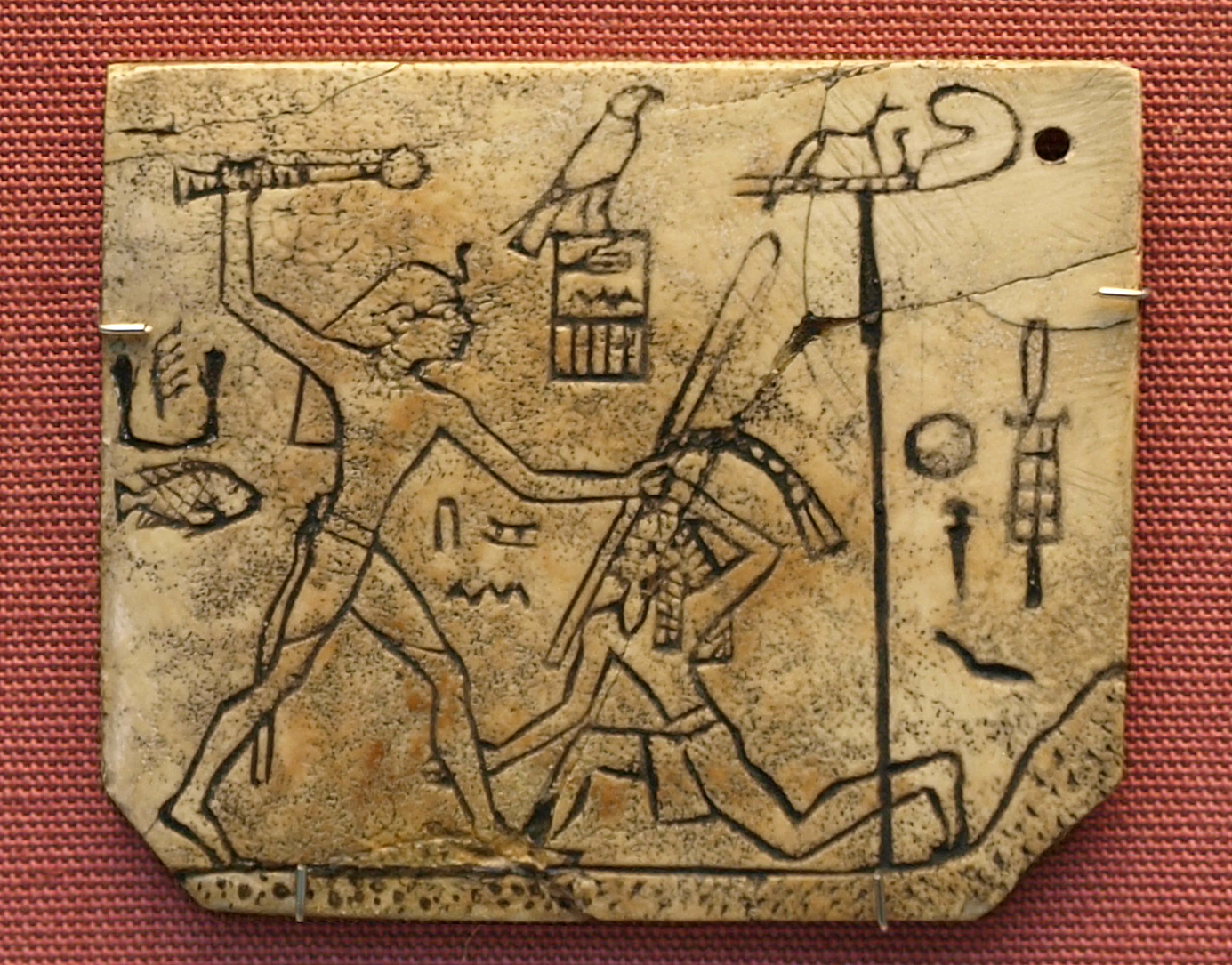
“MacGregor-Label” from Den's tomb in Abydos, EA 55586

=== Year-by-year records ===
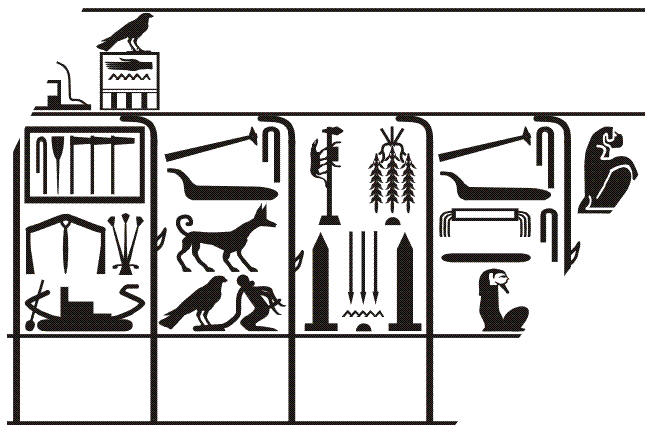
year 14-18 at the recto of the Cairostone fragment C5

More events are reported on the Palermo Stone fragments. Cairo Stone, fragment C5:

- 14th year: Creating an image of Hedj-wer (rest is missing).
- 15th year: Smiting of the Asiatic people.
- 16th year: Creating an imiut fetish in the senut-shrine.
- 17th year: Smiting of the dog-like people.
- 18th year: The planning of the building "Companion of the Gods"; Sokar-festival.

Palermo Stone, main fragment:

- 24th year: Visit to the temple of Ptah... (rest is missing).
- 25th year: Smiting of the Iuntju people.
- 26th year: Appearance of the king of Upper and Lower Egypt; 2nd celebration of the Hebsed.
- 27th year: Planning for the construction of the eastern and western canals through the districts of the Rehyts.
- 28th year: 2nd celebration of the Djet-festival.
- 29th year: Stretching the cords (a foundation ceremony) for the divine fortress Isut-Netjeru (“thrones of the gods”).
- 30th year: Stretching the cords for the royal palace of the divine fortress Isut-Netjeru by the high priest of Seshat.
- 31st year: Inauguration of the sacred lakes at the divine fortress Isut-Netjeru; royal hippopotamus hunt.
- 32nd year: Residing at Nenj-nesw (Heracleopolis Magna) and at the lake of the god Heryshaf.
- 33rd year: Sailing trip to Sah-Setni; foundation/destruction of the city Wer-Ka.
- 34th year: Creation of a statue for the god Sed.
- 35th year: Appearance of the king of Upper and Lower Egypt; 1st race of the Apis-Bull.
- 36th year: Creation of a statue for the goddesses Seshat and Mafdet.
- 37th year: Appearance of the king of Lower- and... (rest is missing)

The second celebration of the Hebsed (a throne jubilee) is affirmed by several stone vessel inscriptions from Den's necropolis.

== Tomb ==
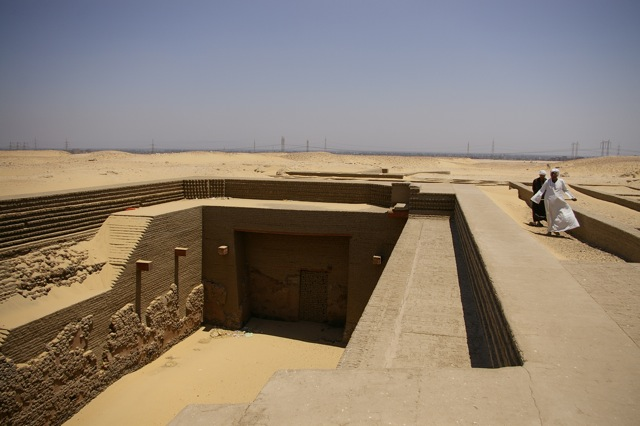
The reconstructed entrance to "Tomb T" at Umm el-Qa'ab in Abydos, the tomb of Den

Den was interred within a tomb ("Tomb T") in the Umm El Qa'ab area of Abydos, which is associated with other First Dynasty kings. Tomb T is among the largest and most finely-built of the tombs in this area, and is the first to feature a staircase and a floor made of granite.

His was the first tomb to have a flight of stairs leading to it, those of earlier kings being filled directly above from their roofs. It is possible the tomb was used as a storehouse for surplus produce during the king's lifetime, while also making it easier to add grave goods for later use in the afterlife by Den.

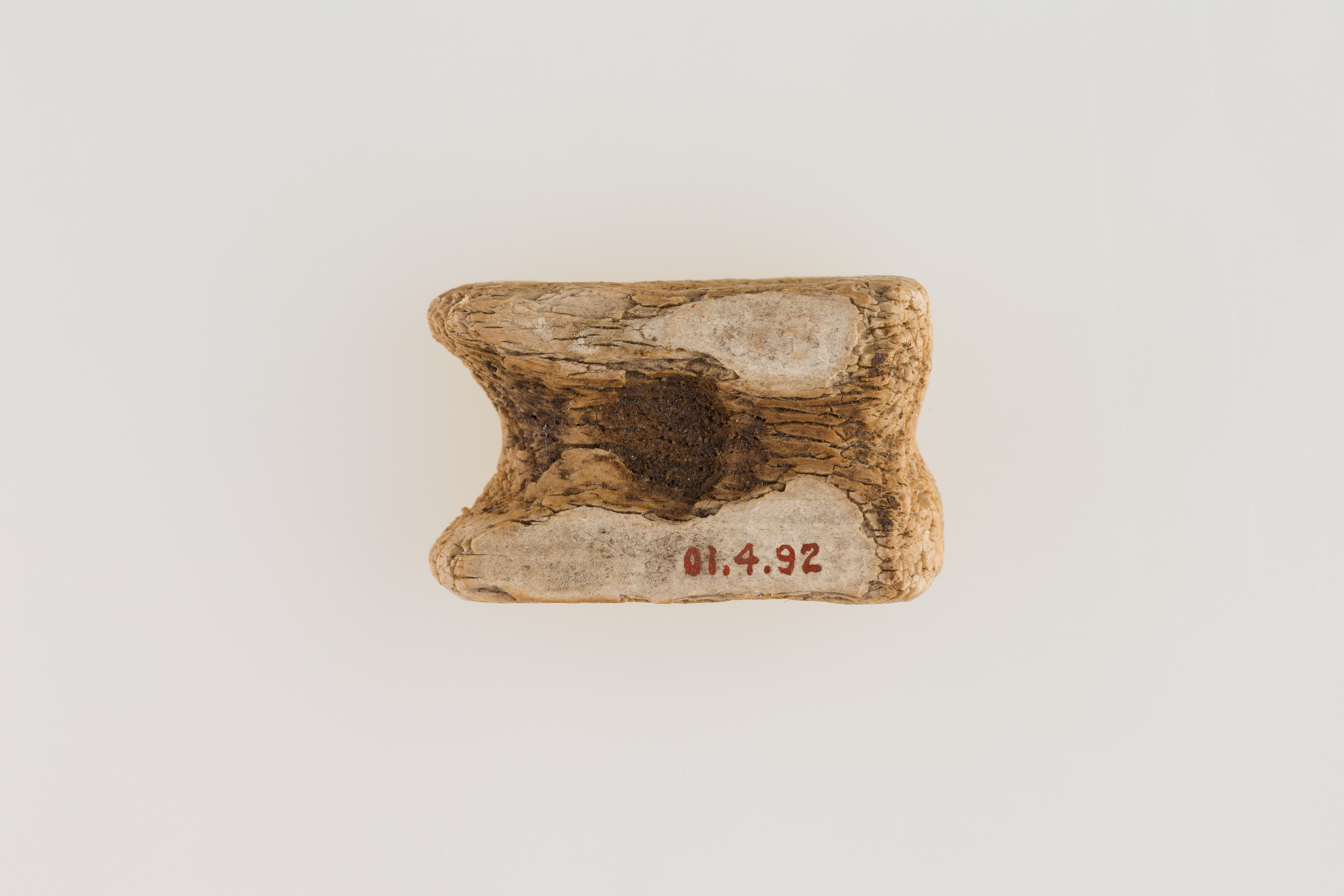
A knuckle bone found inside Tomb T at Umm el-Qa'ab in Abydos, possibly belonging to Den himself.

Tomb T is also the first tomb to include architectural elements made of stone rather than mud-brick. In the original layout for the tomb, a wooden door was located about halfway up the staircase, and a portcullis placed in front of the burial chamber, designed to keep out tomb robbers. The floor of the tomb was paved in red and black granite from Aswan, the first architectural use of such hard stone on a large scale.

Twenty labels made of ivory and ebony were found in his tomb, 18 by Flinders Petrie in the spoil heaps left by the less thorough Émile Amélineau. Among these labels are the earliest known depictions of a pharaoh wearing the double-crown of Egypt (see above), as well as running between ritual stele as part of the Sed festival. Also found are seal impressions that provide the earliest confirmed king list.

Tomb T is surrounded by the burial sites of 136 men and women who were buried at the same time as the king. Thought to be the king's retainers, an examination of some of the skeletons suggests they were strangled, making this an example of human sacrifice which is considered to be common with the pharaohs of the First Dynasty. This practice seems to have ceased by the end of the dynasty, with ushabtis taking the place of the bodies of actual people to aid the pharaohs with the work expected of them in the afterlife.

== See also ==
- List of pharaohs
- Den seal impressions

Preceded by Djet	Pharaoh of Egypt	Succeeded by Anedjib
