= Pyramid of Athribis =

Former mud brick pyramid in Athribis, Egypt

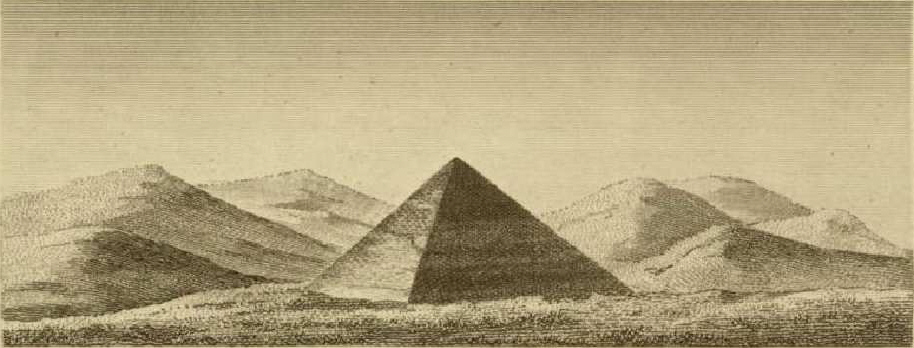
- The pyramid of Athribis – engraving from Description de l'Egypte (1823)

- Location of Athribis in Egypt
- 30°28′14″N 31°11′17″E
- Type: Mud-brick Pyramid
- Material: mudbrick
- Height: less than 16 m
- Base: ~ 20 m
- Slope: ~ 50°

The pyramid of Athribis was a small mudbrick pyramid located at Athribis (Tell Atrib) in the southern Nile Delta, northeast of the modern city of Banha. It was located the furthest north of all the pyramids in ancient Egypt and the only known pyramid to have been built in the Delta.

== Discovery and loss ==
The structure was first noted by scholarship during Napoleon's Egyptian Expedition (1798-1801). No real investigation was undertaken, however, aside from an engraving of the pyramid and a map of the ruins of Athribis which includes the pyramid, both of which were first published in the Description de l’Égypte in 1822. After that, for a long time, the pyramid was forgotten.

The pyramid was first relocated in 1938 by a team from Liverpool University led by Alan Rowe. In the meanwhile the superstructure had been almost entirely destroyed. Time constraints prevented Rowe from undertaking close investigation and as a result his report was extremely short and contained no information beyond what had already been reported by the French expedition.

The most recent attempt to locate the pyramid was undertaken in 1993 by the Polish Egyptologist Andrzej Ćwiek. By this time, however, Athribis had been almost entirely covered over by the modern city of Banha, the pyramid had been completely destroyed and its exact location could no longer be determined.

=== Structure ===
The dimensions of the pyramid were never exactly determined, so they can only be estimated from the information in the Description de l'Egypte. On the basis of mastabas appearing in the map, Ćwiek calculated that the pyramid measured about 20 m (66 ft) on each side. He estimated that the incline was less than 50°. This would imply a height of less than 16 m (52 ft).

=== Age and purpose ===
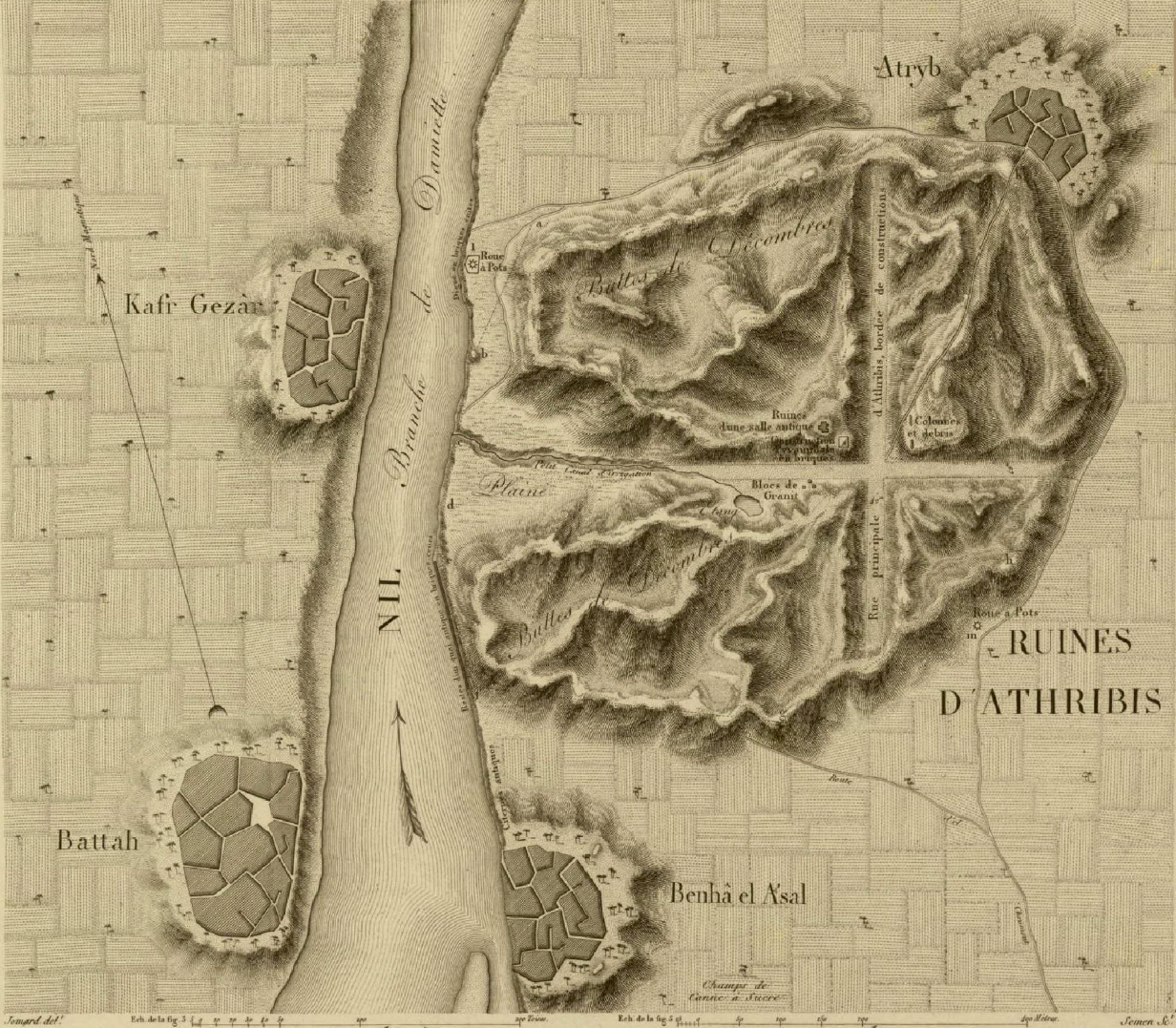
Map of Athribis from the Description de l'Egypte (1823). The pyramid is at the centre of the ruins, in the upper left corner of crossroads.

It is only possible to speculate about the age and purpose of the pyramid, owing to the extremely sparse datable material. The Egyptologist Nabil Swelim and the former director of the DAI in Cairo Rainer Stadelmann connect it with a group of seven small step pyramids (Elephantine, Edfu South, el-Kula, Naqada, Zawyet el-Maiyitin, Seila and Sinki) which were built at the end of the 3rd Dynasty (reigned c. 2686-c. 2613 BCE) or the start of the 4th (reigned ca. 2613 –ca. 2494 BC).

Stadelmann sees these structures as local instantiations of royal power, comparable to the Kaiserpfalz-system of the Holy Roman Empire, while Swelim instead suggests a religious purpose. However, the inclusion of the pyramid of Athribis within this group is not firmly demonstrated by either scholar. In fact it derives only from the fact that the hypothetical dimensions of the pyramid are similar to those of the other seven pyramids, while there are major factors arguing against the identification: firstly, the engraving in the Description depicts the Pyramid as a true pyramid, not a step pyramid like the other seven; secondly, the other seven pyramids are built of stone, while the pyramid of Athribis was made of brick. On account of this last point in particular, Ćwiek criticised Swelim and Stadelmann's inclusion of this pyramid in that group. He further considered it unlikely that a brick structure would have survived in such good condition from the Old Kingdom until the beginning of the 19th century. In his opinion, therefore, it was probably a pyramid from the 13th Dynasty (reigned 1803–1649 BC), if not the Late Period (c. 664 BC – 332 BC).

== See also ==
- Egyptian pyramid construction techniques
- List of Egyptian pyramids

== Bibliography ==
- Jan Bock. "Die kleinen Stufenpyramiden des frühen Alten Reiches." Sokar. No. 12.1 (2006), p. 21.
- Andrzej Ćwiek. "Date and Function of the so-called Minor Step Pyramids." Göttinger Miszellen Vol. 162, Göttingen 1998, pp. 41 f.
- Description de l'Egypte ou Recueil des observations et des recherches qui ont ete faites en Egypte pendant l'expedition de l'armee française. Antiquités. Tome cinquème. 2nd Edition, Paris 1823, Tbl. 27 (Online version)
- Alan Rowe. "Short Report on Excavations of the Institute of Archaeology, Liverpool, at Athribis (Tell Atrib)." Annales du Service des Antiquités Vol. 38 (1938), p. 524.
