= Edfu South pyramid =

Step pyramid

Coordinates: 24°56′37.43″N 32°50′31.27″E

Huni ?
- Constructed: 3rd Dynasty ?
- Type: Step pyramid
- Material: sandstone
- Height: Original: 10.46 m – 12.55 m Current: 4.90 m
- Base: 18.30 m – 18.80 m

The Edfu South pyramid is part of a group of seven very similar small step pyramids which were all built far from the main centres of Egypt and about which very little is known, along with the pyramids of Elephantine, el-Kula, Naqada, Zawyet el-Maiyitin, Sinki and Seila. It is located about five kilometres south of Edfu near Naga el-Ghoneimeya. It was first identified as a pyramid in 1979, when the German archaeologists Günter Dreyer and Werner Kaiser were leading a survey of Edfu after a tip off from the inspector. Further investigation and surveys of the surrounding area have been undertaken since 2010 by the Oriental Institute of the University of Chicago.

== Description ==
According to the findings of Dreyer and Kaiser, the pyramid was 35–36 cubits long on each side (about 18.30–18.80 metres). It is now about 4.9 metres high. It consisted of a core structure measuring 8.3 metres on each side, surrounded by two courses of stone about four cubits thick. Dreyer and Kaiser suggested that the pyramid had had three steps. The angle of the slope cannot be accurately determined, but it was probably between 10° and 14°. The pyramid is almost oriented to the north, but is slightly off true north (like the other pyramids named above) as it is primarily oriented in order to be parallel to the Nile. The pyramid is built from local grey-blue and red sandstone. The individual blocks are only roughly hewn – on average they are 30 cm thick, but the largest examples measure 60–80 cm. A mixture of clay and sand was used as mortar.

== Construction and function ==
The builder and purpose of the pyramid are unknown. Dreyer and Kaiser thought that it and the other pyramids named above were part of a single building project of Pharaoh Huni, the last ruler of the Third Dynasty. Andrzej Ćwiek mostly agrees, but suggests that Huni's successor, Sneferu (c.2670–2630 BC) the founder of the Fourth Dynasty, was the builder. Speculation about the function of the pyramids ranges from a representation of the king, a depiction of the benben, or a symbol of the political and religious unity of the land to a cenotaph for a royal wife.

== See also ==
- List of Egyptian pyramids

== Bibliography ==
- Jan Bock: Die kleinen Stufenpyramiden des frühen Alten Reiches. In: Sokar. Nr. 12 (1/2006), S. 20–29.
- Andrzej Ćwiek: Date and Function of the so-called Minor Step Pyramids. In: Göttinger Miszellen. Bd. 162, 1998, S. 39–52.
- Günter Dreyer und Werner Kaiser: Zu den kleinen Stufenpyramiden Ober- und Mittelägyptens. In: Mitteilungen des Deutschen Archäologischen Instituts, Abteilung Kairo. Band 36, 1980, S. 45.
- Mark Lehner: Das Geheimnis der Pyramiden in Ägypten. Orbis, München 1999, ISBN 357201039X, S. 96.
- Gregory Marouard, Hratch Papazian: The Edfu Pyramid Project. Recent Investigation at the Last Provincial Step Pyramid. In: The Oriental Institute News & Notes. No. 213, 2012, S. 3–9 (PDF; 2,3 MB).
- Ali Radwan: Die Stufenpyramiden. In: Zahi Hawass (Hrsg.): Die Schätze der Pyramiden. Weltbild, Augsburg 2004, ISBN 3828908098, S. 111.
- Miroslav Verner: Die Pyramiden. Rowohlt, Reinbek 1998, ISBN 3499608901, S. 199.
