= Pyramid of Elephantine =

Step pyramid

- Location of pyramid in Egypt
- 24°5′8″N 32°53′7″E
- Owner: Huni ?
- Constructed: 3rd Dynasty ?
- Type: Step Pyramid
- Material: Rose granite
- Height: originally 10.46 m – 12.55 m, now 5.10 m
- Base: 18,46 m

The pyramid of Elephantine is part of a group of seven very similar small step pyramids, along with the pyramids at Edfu South, el-Kula, Naqada, Zawyet el-Maiyitin, Seila, and Sinki. All of these were built far from the main centres of Egypt and are very poorly understood. The pyramid of Elephantine is located in the northwest part of the Old Kingdom city on the south end of the island of Elephantine in the Nile. The structure was discovered in 1907, but it could only be identified as a pyramid after excavations by the German Archaeological Institute in 1978–79.

== Description ==
The pyramid originally would have had three steps. Today it is 5.1 metres tall, but the original height would have been between 20 and 24 cubits (10.46 - 12.55 m). To deal with the irregular ground level, the pyramid was built on a square platform, which measured 23.7 metres on each side. The sides of the pyramid itself were 18.46 metres long. The building is oriented parallel to the west bank of the island, which leaves it 17° off north, to the west. The pyramid consisted of a core structure which was surrounded by two layers of stone with a thickness of four cubits. Locally sourced pink granite was used as a building material. The substructure is made from large hewn blocks, with a mixture of Nile mud and sand for mortar. For the actual pyramid, unhewn granite blocks were used and particularly hard loam mortar was used to hold them together. No chamber system exists. On the north side of the structure is a cut near the middle, which was made by the 1909 French excavation team led by Henri Gauthier.

== Previous interpretations ==
On their discovery in 1907, the remains of the pyramid were initially mistaken for part of the city wall. This interpretation was seemingly confirmed by the discovery of a granite cone near the pyramid with an inscription of the Pharaoh Huni, naming him as the builder of a fortress (according to a more recent reading, as the builder of a palace). Another interpretation considered the structure as the remains of a putative temple of Yahweh. Herbert Ricke, finally, interpreted the substructure as a royal palace. Only with the excavations of Günter Dreyer in 1978/9 could it be clearly shown to be a pyramid.

== Builder and purpose ==
The builder and the purpose of the pyramid are unknown. Günter Dreyer and Werner Kaiser(Egyptologist) considered it and the other pyramids named above to be a building project of Huni, the last ruler of the 3rd Dynasty. This proposal was based solely on the suggestion that the aforementioned granite cone was directly related to the pyramid of Elephantine. The Polish Egyptologist Andrzej Ćwiek expressed doubt about this, since the text of the cone speaks of a palace, not a pyramid. In his opinion, if the cone was ever part of the pyramid, it was only after having been reused as building material. Finds at Seila prompted Čwiek to suggest that Huni's successor Sneferu (c. 2670–2620 BC), the founder of the Fourth Dynasty, was the builder of all seven step pyramids. Speculation about the function of the structure ranges from a representation of the royal power to a depiction of the Benben, a symbol of the political and religious unity of the land, or the cenotaph of a royal wife.

== See also ==
- Egyptian pyramid construction techniques
- List of Egyptian pyramids

== Bibliography ==
- Jan Bock: "Die kleinen Stufenpyramiden des frühen Alten Reiches." In: Sokar. No. 12 (1/2006), p. 2029.
- Andrzej Ćwiek: "Date and Function of the so-called Minor Step Pyramids." In: Göttinger Miszellen. Band 162, Göttingen 1998, pp. 39–52.
- Günter Dreyer: "Stadt und Tempel von Elephantine. Achter Grabungsbericht." Mitteilungen des Deutschen Archäologischen Instituts, Abteilung Kairo. No. 36, von Zabern, Mainz 1980, pp. 276–280.
- Günter Dreyer, Werner Kaiser: "Zu den kleinen Stufenpyramiden Ober- und Mittelägyptens." Mitteilungen des Deutschen Archäologischen Instituts, Abteilung Kairo. No. 36, von Zabern, Mainz 1980, pp. 43f.
- Mark Lehner: Das Geheimnis der Pyramiden in Ägypten. Orbis, München 1999, ISBN 3-572-01039-X, p. 96.
- Ali Radwan: "Die Stufenpyramiden." In: Zahi Hawass (Ed.): Die Schätze der Pyramiden. Weltbild, Augsburg 2004, ISBN 3-8289-0809-8, p. 111.
- Stephan Johannes Seidlmayer: "Die staatliche Anlage der 3. Dynastie in der Nordweststadt von Elephantine. Archäologische und historische Probleme." In Manfred Bietak (Ed.): Haus und Palast im Alten Ägypten. Verlag der Österreichischen Akademie der Wissenschaften, Wien 1996, ISBN 3-7001-2209-8, pp. 195–214.
- Miroslav Verner: Die Pyramiden. (= rororo-Sachbuch. Band 60890). Rowohlt-Taschenbuch-Verlag, Reinbek 1998, ISBN 3-499-60890-1, pp. 199f.
