= Pyramid of Seila =

Archaeological site in the Egyptian depression of el-Faiyum

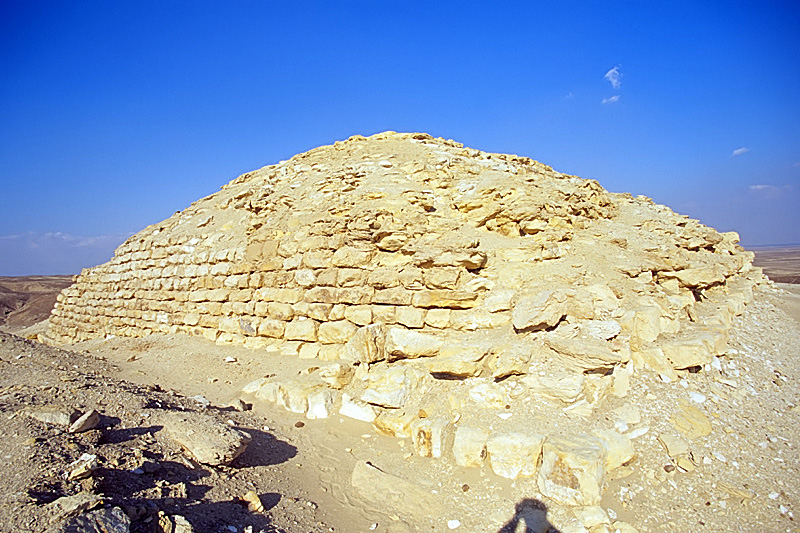
- Western and southern sides of the pyramid of Seila, 2003

- Location within Egypt
- 29°22′57″N 31°3′13″E
- Owner: Owner uncertain, possibly Sneferu
- Constructed: c. 2600 BC
- Type: Step pyramid
- Material: limestone
- Height: c. 6.65 meters
- Base: c. 25 meters

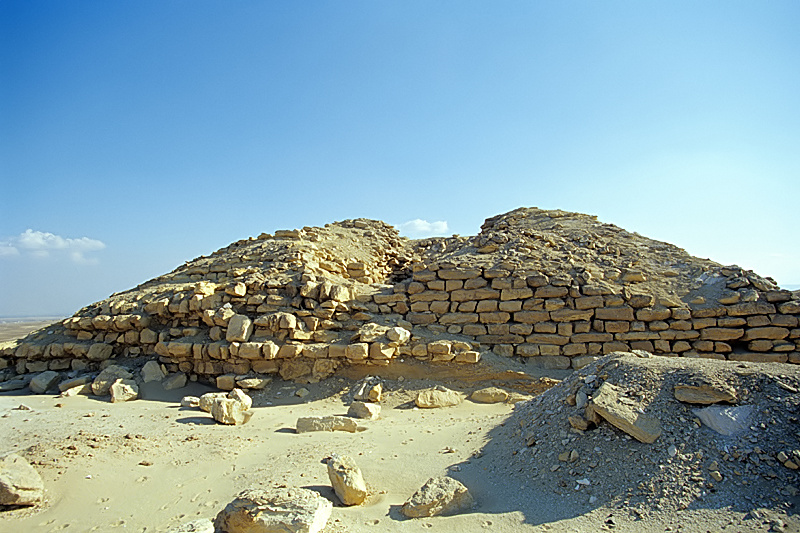
North side of the pyramid of Seila, 2003

The pyramid of Seila is one of a group of seven small step pyramids which are very similar to one another, along with the Edfu South pyramid, the pyramid of Elephantine, the pyramid of El-Kula, the pyramid of Naqada, the pyramid of Zawyet el-Maiyitin, and the pyramid of Sinki. These pyramids were all built far from the major centres of Egypt and very little is known about them. The pyramid is located on an outcrop between the Faiyum Oasis and the Nile Valley, about 6 km north of the motorway from Wasta to Faiyum. Its builder may have been Sneferu, the founder of the Fourth Dynasty. It was discovered in 1889/1890 by Flinders Petrie and revisited in 1898 by Ludwig Borchardt.

== Description ==
The pyramid is about 25 m long on each side and now stands 6.5-6.8 m tall. It is not oriented exactly to the cardinal directions, but diverges about 12° to the northwest. The reason for this orientation is that, like the pyramids at Elephantine, Naqada, and Saufet el-Meitin, the structure was oriented to be parallel to the course of the Nile, which would have been difficult to accomplish given the great distance of the pyramid from the river. The pyramid originally had four steps and consisted of three layers, which encased an inner core. The building material was local limestone, with a mixture of Nile mud and sand being used for mortar. There does not seem to have been a burial chamber.

== Construction and function ==
In 1987, fragments of an offering table, two stele and the remains of a causeway were found on the east side of the pyramid. One of the steles bore the name Snefru, which may indicate that he was the builder. The purpose of the structure remains unclear. Jean-Philippe Lauer suggested that it might have been the original tomb of the queen Hetepheres I, but this is unlikely given the absence of a burial chamber. Egyptologists generally consider the group of seven step pyramids named above to have been a unified project, but have not reached an agreement on what the purpose of the group was. Different scholars have suggested that they were representations of the primeval mound, symbols of the political and religious unity of Egypt, or monuments commemorating the royal wives.

== Bibliography ==
- Juan A. Belmonte Avilés, Mosalam Shaltout (ed.): In Search of Cosmic Order. Selected Essays on Egyptian Archaeoastronomy. Supreme Council of Antiquities Press, Kairo 2009, ISBN 978-977-479-483-4 (Google Books).
- Juan A. Belmonte Avilés, Mosalam Shaltout, Magdi M. Fektri: Astronomy and landscape in Ancient Egypt. Challenging the enigma of the minor step pyramids (= Trabajos de Egiptologia. Papers on Ancient Egypt. Bd. 4). pp. 7–18 (PDF; 2,8 MB).
- Jan Bock: "Die kleinen Stufenpyramiden des frühen Alten Reiches". Sokar. 12 (1/2006), S. 20–29.
- Ludwig Borchardt: "Die Pyramide von Silah," Annales du Service des Antiquités de l'Égypte. Vol.1. (1900), pp. 211–214 (PDF; 17,0 MB).
- Andrzej Ćwiek: "Date and Function of the so-called Minor Step Pyramids," Göttinger Miszellen Vol. 162 (1998), pp. 39–52 (Online).
- Günter Dreyer, Werner Kaiser: "Zu den kleinen Stufenpyramiden Ober- und Mittelägyptens". Mitteilungen des Deutschen Archäologischen Instituts Abteilung Kairo. Vol. 36 (1980), pp. 49f.
- Jean-Philippe Lauer: Histoire monumentale des pyramides d'Égypte. Kairo 1962, p. 223.
- Mark Lehner: Das Geheimnis der Pyramiden in Ägypten. Orbis, München 1999, ISBN 3-572-01039-X, p. 96.
- André Pochan: "Pyramide de Seila (au Fayoum)" Bulletin de l'IInstitut français d'archéologie orientale. Vol. 37 (1937) (PDF; 0,4 MB).
- Ali Radwan: "Die Stufenpyramiden". In: Zahi Hawass (ed.): Die Schätze der Pyramiden. Weltbild, Augsburg 2004, ISBN 3-8289-0809-8, p. 111.
- Rainer Stadelmann: "Snofru – Builder and Unique Creator of the Pyramids of Seila and Meidum". In: Ola El-Aguizy, Mohamed Sherif Ali (ed.): Echoes of Eternity. Studies presented to Gaballa Aly Gaballa (= Philippika. Marburger altertumskundliche Abhandlungen. Vol. 5). Harrassowitz, Wiesbaden 2010, ISBN 978-3-447-06215-2, pp. 31–38 (GoogleBooks).
- Nabil Swelim: "An Aerial View of the Layer Monument of Snfrw a Seila". In: Eva-Maria Engel, Vera Müller, Ulrich Hartung (ed.): Zeichen aus dem Sand. Streiflichter aus Ägyptens Geschichte zu Ehren von Günter Dreyer (= MENES. Studien zur Kultur und Sprache der ägyptischen Frühzeit und des Alten Reiches. Vol. 5). Harrassowitz, Wiesbaden 2008, ISBN 978-3-447-05816-2, pp. 647–653 (PDF; 290 kB).
- Nabil Swelim: "Reconstruction of the Layer Monument of Snfrw at Seila". In: Ola El-Aguizy, Mohamed Sherif Ali (ed.): Echoes of Eternity. Studies presented to Gaballa Aly Gaballa (= Philippika. Marburger altertumskundliche Abhandlungen. Vol. 5) Harrassowitz, Wiesbaden 2010, ISBN 978-3-447-06215-2, pp. 39–56 (PDF; 1,5 MB).
- Miroslav Verner: Die Pyramiden (= rororo-Sachbuch. Band 60890). Rowohlt, Reinbek bei Hamburg 1999, ISBN 3-499-60890-1, p. 196.
