= Qahedjet =

Horus name of an ancient Egyptian king (pharaoh)

- Huni ?
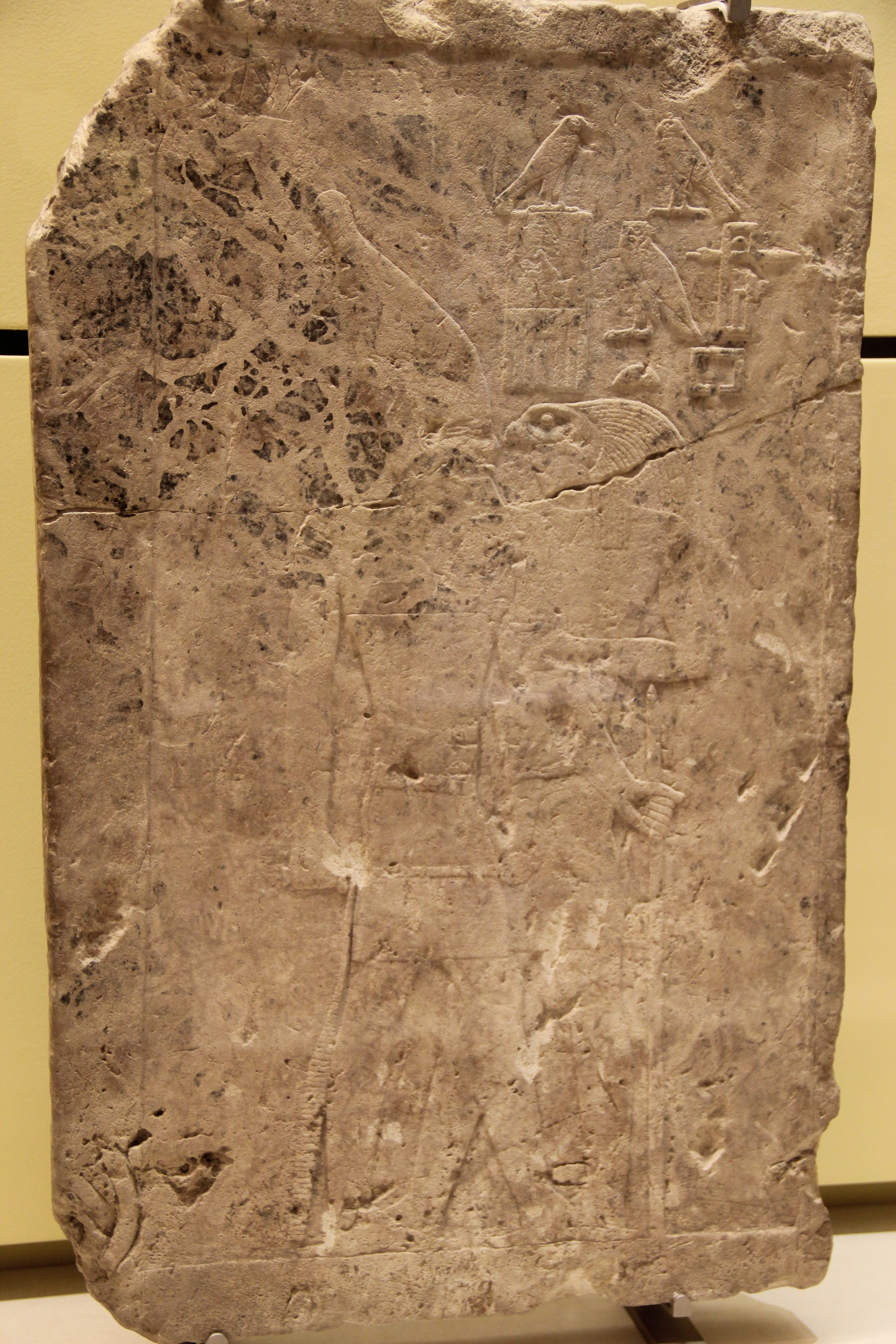
- Stela of Qahedjet

Pharaoh
- Reign: unknown
- Predecessor: unknown
- Successor: Huni? Sneferu?
Royal titulary
Horus name
Hor-Qahedjet
Ḥr-Q3j-ḥḏ.t
Raised crown of Horus
He with the raised White Crown
G5	N29 S1
- Dynasty: 3rd Dynasty

Qahedjet (also Hor-Qahedjet) could be the Horus name of an ancient Egyptian king (pharaoh), who may have ruled during the 3rd Dynasty or could be a voluntarily archaistic representation of Thutmose III. Since the only artifact attesting to the ruler and his name is a small stela made of polished limestone of uncertain origin and authenticity, Egyptologists are discussing the chronological position and historical figure of Qahedjet.

== The stela ==
=== Description ===
The stela of king Qahedjet is 50.5 cm (19.9 in) high, 31.0 cm (12.2 in) wide and 3.0 cm (1.2 in) thick and made of finely polished limestone. It was bought in 1967 by the Louvre at Paris, where it is now on display. The front shows king Qahedjet embracing an anthropomorphic form of the god Horus. King Qahedjet wears the White crown of Upper Egypt and an artificial king's beard, and looks directly into Horus' eyes, both figures being the same height. His face looks remarkable with his crooked nose, the bulging lips and his square chin. The king wears a kilt with a dagger in a belt. In his left hand, he holds a mace while in his right hand he holds a staff with a wing-like mark at middle height. Horus has laid his right arm around Qahedjet's shoulder and holds Qahedjet's elbow in his left hand. The hieroglyphic inscription describes the king's visit to the northern shrine of the god Ra at Heliopolis.

=== Authenticity ===
The authenticity of Qahedjet's stela is questioned by Egyptologists such as Jean-Pierre Pätznik and Jacques Vandier. They point to several stylistic contradictions that can be found within the relief motif. Firstly, they stress that the earliest known depiction of an anthropomorphic Horus is found in the pyramid temple of Sahure, second pharaoh of the 5th Dynasty. Secondly, they argue that the motif of a king embracing a god (or a god embracing a king) would be highly unusual for the Old Kingdom, since the king was then seen as the living representation of Horus (and Seth), but not seen on a par with them in this way. Depictions showing a king in an intimate pose with a god would therefore be heretical and provocative at the same time.

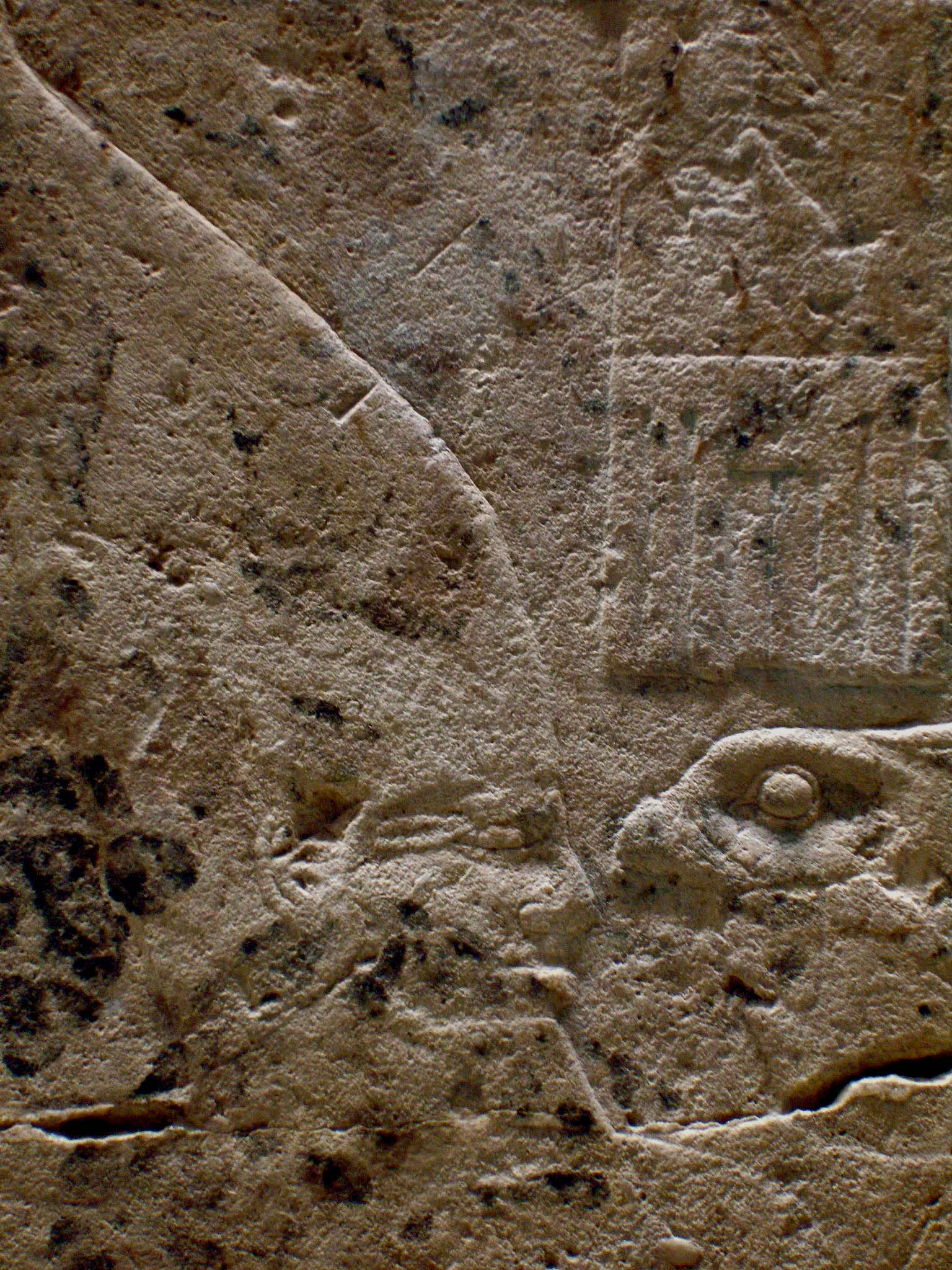
Detail of the stela.

Further arguments of Pätznik and Vandier concern the inscriptions right of Qahedjet's serekh. The hieroglyphic signs are unusually shifted to the right and they are not square in arrangement. This contradicts the Egyptian rules of calligraphy on royal monuments. Additionally, the details on the owl-sign (value m) of the stele do not appear before the first half of the 18th Dynasty and the stele would represent the earliest formulation Horus + m + toponym. Finally, serekh names involving a royal crown as a hieroglyphic symbol are otherwise only known from king Thutmose III of the 18th Dynasty onwards, and Pätznik and Vandier remark that Qahedjet is known to be a variant of Thutmose III's Horus name, so that the stele, if authentic, could be an archaistic work of the New Kingdom.

Alternatively, the square face of Qahedjet, resembling that of king Djoser may represent an archaistic production from the much later Saite period. During this era reliefs with clear hommages to the art of the Old Kingdom were seen as “en vogue”. As an example, Pätznik and Vandier point to a naos of Djoser found at Heliopolis (now in fragments), that shows Djoser sitting on a Hebsed-throne. Djoser appears nearly identical in the reliefs of his necropolis at Saqqara, but a small guiding inscription reveals that the naos was built in the 7th-6th century BCE, during the Saitic period.

Their last argument concerns the word Hut-a'a (meaning "great palace"), the place which Qahedjet is represented visiting. The way Hut-a'a is written on the stela is known not to be in use before the very end of the Old Kingdom and become common only from the time of king Senwosret I of the 12th Dynasty onwards. Furthermore, Hut-a'a is generally identified with the temple of Ra in Heliopolis, which is located in Lower Egypt while Qahedjet wears the crown of Upper Egypt. On the other hand, reliefs from Djoser's pyramid complex always depict the king wearing the crown corresponding to the places he is shown visiting.

Thus, the several contradictions in the relief's artistic program make Jaques Vandier and Jean-Pierre Pätznik wonder if the stela is authentic or just a modern fake. The uncertain origins of the stela, which was acquired by the Louvre in 1967 from a private antique dealer in Cairo only lends more weight to this possibility.

== Identity of Qahedjet ==
Assuming its authenticity, Jacques Vandier proposed in his first study of the stele in 1968 that it be dated to the 3rd Dynasty on stylistic grounds, suggesting that Qahedjet be identified with king Huni, the last ruler of the dynasty. Toby A.H. Wilkinson and Ian Shaw are of the same opinion: they think that "Hor-Qahedjet" was the serekh name of Huni, although this assumption is only based on that Huni is the only king of this dynasty whose Horus name is unknown (the name "Huni" is a cartouche name only). Thus, their theory is not commonly accepted.

Similarly, Jürgen von Beckerath, Rainer Stadelmann and Dietrich Wildung considered Qahedjet to have ruled toward the end of the 3rd Dynasty. Again, their theory is based on the stylistic resemblances between Qahedjet's face and that of king Djoser on reliefs from his pyramid complex.

Peter Kaplony dated the stela to the First Intermediate Period of Egypt. Pierre Tallet argued that Qadedjet is king Snofru.
