= Pyramid of Zawyet el-Maiyitin =

Egyptian pyramid

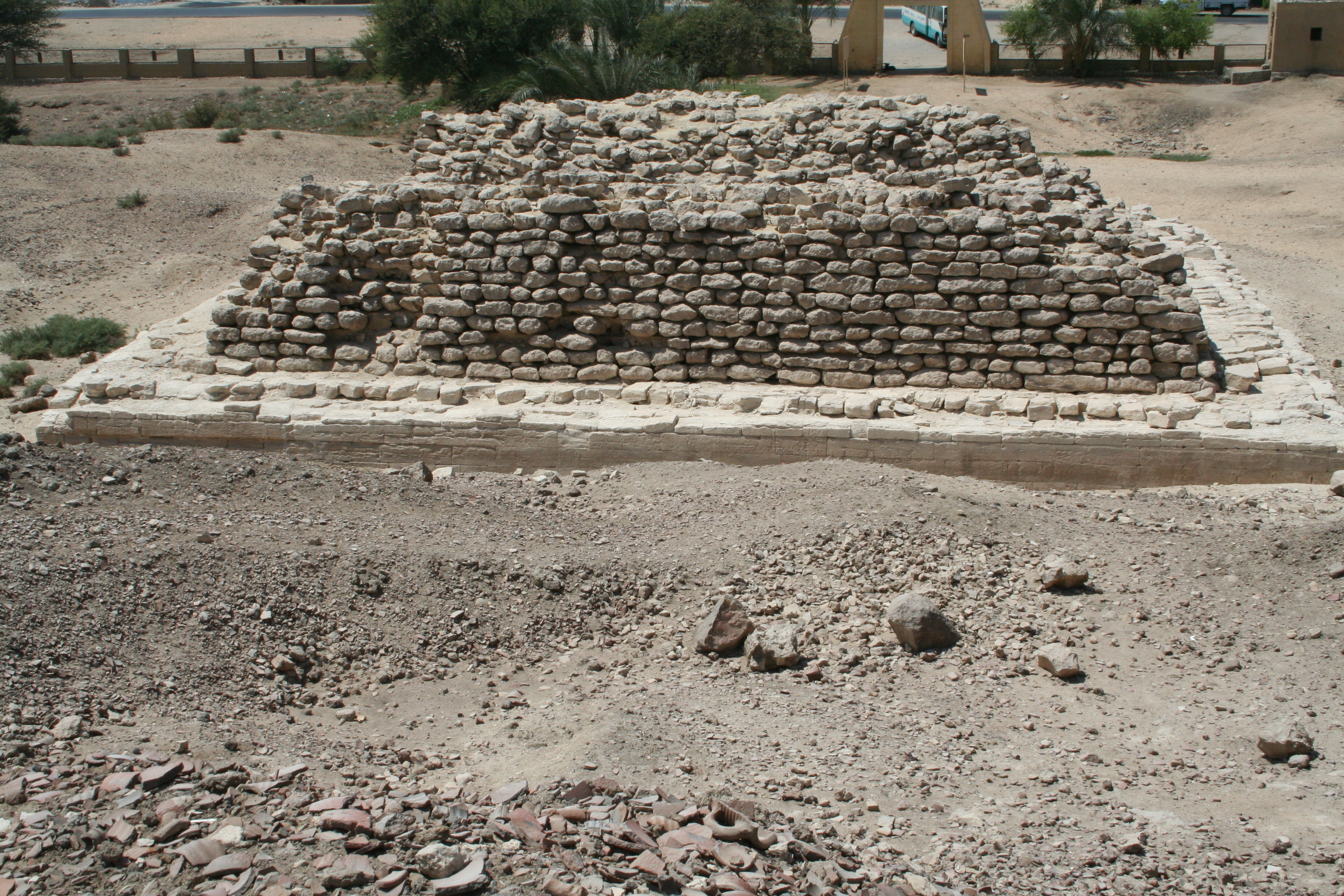
- Pyramid in 2006
- Interactive map of Pyramid of Zawyet el-Maiyitin
- 28.0457°N 30.8291°E
- Owner: Huni ?
- Constructed: c. 2625 BC
- Type: Step pyramid
- Material: limestone

The pyramid of Zawyet el-Maiyitin, or the pyramid of Hebenu (Note: The pyramid is also known as Pyramid of Zawyet Sultan), is a step pyramid in Zawyet el-Maiyitin, located about 120 km south of the Faiyum Oasis and about 8.5 km south of the city of Minya. It is the only Egyptian pyramid built on the eastern bank of the Nile River.

It is one of a few small provincial pyramids built without tombs, which some believed to have been built under Huni. Other provincial pyramids are located at Edfu South, Elephantine, Naqada, el-Kula, Sinki, and Seila.

In 1911, it was examined by the French Egyptologist Raymond Weill, and in 1962 by the French archaeologist Jean-Philippe Lauer.

== See also ==
- List of Egyptian pyramids
