= Athribis =

- City
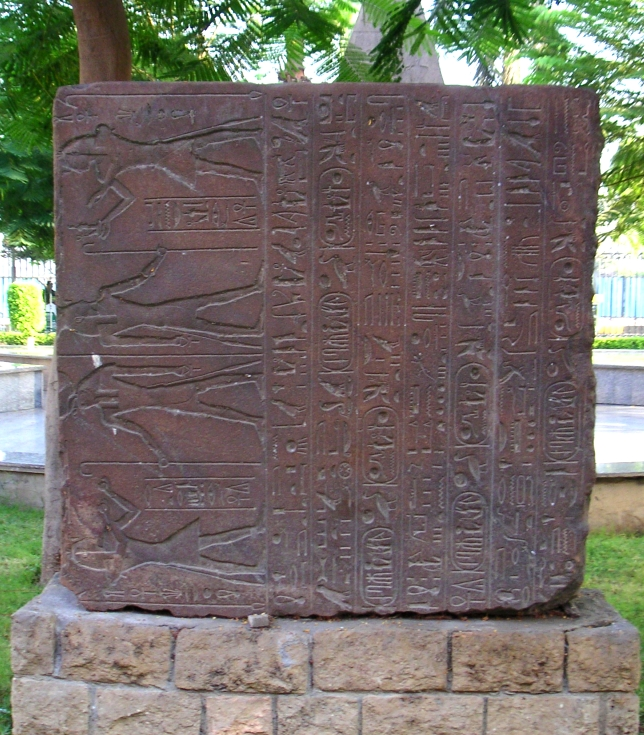
- Block relief usurped by Ramesses II, 19th Dynasty

- Location within Egypt
- Coordinates: 30°28′00″N 31°11′00″E
- Country: Lower Egypt

Hwt t pr tA Hr ib t niwt
ḥt tꜣ ḥrj jb
in hieroglyphs

Athribis (Arabic: أتريب; Greek: Ἄθριβις, from the original Ancient Egyptian: Ḥw.t-tꜣ-ḥry-jb, Coptic: Ⲁⲑⲣⲏⲃⲓ) was an ancient city in Lower Egypt. It is located in present-day Tell Atrib, just northeast of Benha on the hill of Kom Sidi Yusuf. The town lies around 40 km north of Cairo, on the eastern bank of the Damietta branch of the Nile. It was mainly occupied during the Ptolemaic, Roman, and Byzantine eras.

== Background ==
Athribis was once the capital of the tenth Lower Egyptian nome.

=== Early Bronze Age ===
The Palermo Stone indicates Egyptian occupation of the site dating back to the Old Kingdom of Egypt, with the earliest mention of Athribis dating to the reign of Sahure. This could perhaps have been confirmed in 2010 with the discovery of a mastaba dating to the late Third Dynasty to early Fourth Dynasty in nearby Quesna.

=== Middle Bronze Age ===
After this, archeological evidence exists for an occupation during the 12th Dynasty of the Middle Kingdom. Today, many of the preexisting artifacts are lost every year because local farmers like sebakh, fertilizer made from the ancient mudbrick blocks that were used for most of the buildings.

=== Late Bronze Age ===
==== 18th Dynasty ====
It is also known as the birthplace of Amenhotep, son of Hapu, who gained considerable recognition and prestige in his time as a public official, architect, and scribe for pharaoh Amenhotep III. The former Amenhotep leveraged his influence to convince the pharaoh to patron the town and its local god. A local temple was rebuilt by Amenhotep III during the Eighteenth Dynasty, although it no longer stands today.

==== 19th dynasty ====
One of the two lying lion statues at the Egyptian Museum is thought to be from the temple, but since it was usurped by Ramesses II, its true origin is unknown. Ramesses II also enlarged the local temple, placing two obelisks in black granite that are now located at the Egyptian Museum.

=== Iron Age ===
Later, during the 26th Dynasty, Ahmose II also had a temple built at Athribis. He was an essential figure in Mediterranean trade and diplomacy. Local texts also suggest that the site used to have a temple dedicated to the god Khenti-kheti. In 1946, the tomb of Takhuit, queen of Psamtik II, was found along with other Late Period tombs.

=== Classical Age ===
==== Ptolemaic period ====
Although Athribis was occupied during the later dynasties, the city didn’t gain real power until the early Ptolemaic Kingdom. That was when it became the tenth lower Egyptian nome. Most of the Ptolemaic layers, mainly the ones dating to the 3rd century and the first half of the 2nd century BCE, were not destroyed by later building activity or robbers. Evidence shows that Graeco-Roman occupation could have been as early as the "Ptolemaic II" archaeological phase. During the middle Ptolemaic era and up to the 3rd century, Athribis was a busy town with a large therma (bathhouse), villas, and industrial buildings. This is considered the eastern part of Athribis. Early Byzantine excavations are at the northeastern part of the town.

It was used as a pottery workshop during the early Ptolemaic years. Most of the kilns were shaped in circular patterns. Early Byzantine lamps were being made in the area until the late fourth century AD. There was also a significant discovery of stored unfired pottery, which led to more evidence for a large pottery workshop.

=== Middle Ages ===
According to Marian miracle stories dating to the 13th century, Athribis was then a wealthy city with a huge church dedicated to Mary, mother of Jesus, which was the oldest and most beautiful church in all of Egypt.

In the church there were four doors, and in these four doors were four shrines, and above the four shrines were four canopies, which were supported by one hundred and sixty pillars, all of which were hewn out of white stone, and between each pillar was a distance of forty cubits. Each pillar was carved all over with vine branches, and the hollow (or, capitals) of them were sculptured and ornamented with cunning work in stone, and they were encircled with bands of gold and silver. And there were in the church four and twenty saints' chapels, and in them were placed four and twenty Tabernacles of the Law (i.e. the arks that contained the Eucharistic Elements). And in one of these chapels was an image of our holy Lady, the Virgin Mary, the God-bearer, which was sculptured and inlaid with mother-of-pearl, and this image was apparelled in a garment that was made of the purple of Constantinople. And near the image of the Virgin Mary were sculptured the figures of two angels (i.e., Michael and Gabriel) which stood one on each side of it. And the lamps that were hanging before the image were made of gold and silver, and they ceased not to burn by day and by night, and [the servants of the church] kept them supplied and filled with oil.

== Excavations ==
=== Excavation history ===
The first excavation of Athribis dates back to the French invasion of Egypt and Syria and again in 1852 by Auguste Mariette. Even though Athribis has been periodically excavated since the 19th century, it has yet to be fully excavated. Flinders Petrie wrote a book on Athribis in Upper Egypt, so not to be confused with this Lower (northern) Egypt. It was published in 1908.

Major excavations were started only after World War II by Kazimierz Michałowski. For 11 years, he directed an archaeological expedition organized by the Polish Centre of Mediterranean Archaeology University of Warsaw and co-operating institutions: the Research Center for Mediterranean Archaeology of the Polish Academy of Sciences (now Institute of Mediterranean and Oriental Cultures, PAS), the National Museum in Warsaw, the Archaeological Museum of Kraków, the Coptic Committee, and the Egyptian Antiquities Organization. The exploration of the so-called Kom A uncovered the foundations of temples from the reigns of Taharqa and Amasis. The team also discovered a large Roman bath complex. In the 1960s and 1970s, research was conducted on Kom Sidi Youssuf to identify the early Christian basilica. Barbara Ruszczyc directed the works. The subsequent directors, Karol Myśliwiec and Hanna Szymańska, studied the older layers of the site, dating to the Roman and Ptolemaic periods. Annual reports were published in the “Polish Archaeology in the Mediterranean” (since 1990) and “Études et Travaux” (since 1966) journals.

=== Excavation findings ===
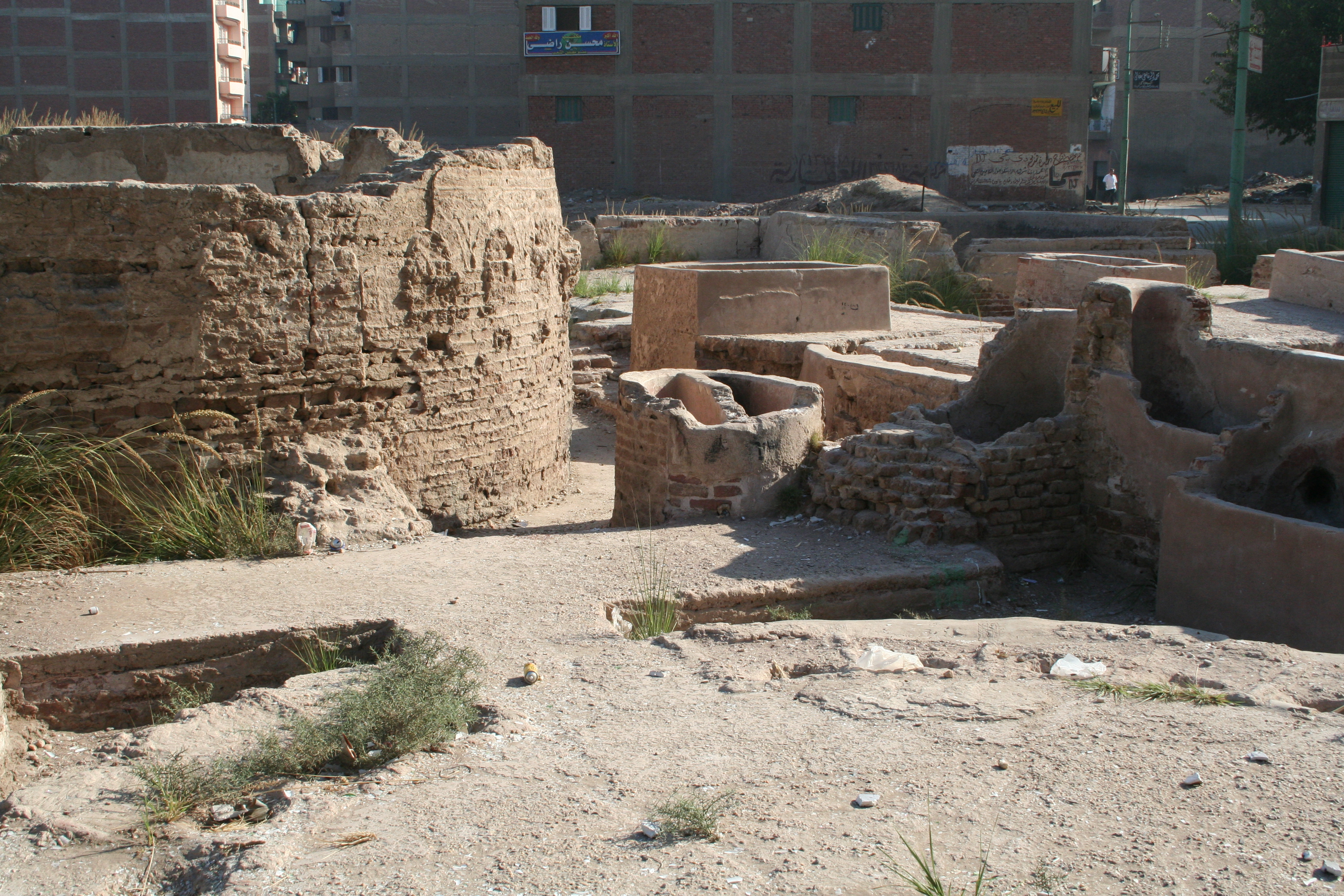
Athribis, Roman era settlement

Over 300 figurines were found throughout Athribis, mostly in the Ptolemaic layers. Some of the artifacts were of terracotta form. Many of the figurines depicted were heads of small dwarf-like creatures, and some were also used as oil lamps in the bathhouses. "Ptolemaic VI" is the phase that has been found to have the most artifacts or figurines. They were also more carefully crafted in design than other layers' findings and better preserved. Depictions of Egyptian and Greek gods and goddesses were also abundant. Dionysus and Aphrodite seemed to be popular throughout the findings at Athribis. It is considered that these figurines could have been made in the pottery workshops. Most were made of terracotta, and others believe the figurines could have had more of a cult meaning. It is suggested that the Dionysus and Aphrodite figures, mostly erotic, could have played as a type of fertility cult in the bathhouse areas since a lot of the figurines were found in excavated remains of the bath area. Egyptian gods were also being depicted as Greek gods in the making of the figurines. Isis was being depicted as Aphrodite in some cases, or a Hercules statue shown with Dionysus. The god Silen was also depicted in one of the excavated oil lamps, dated from the late second century. It shows that even though Athribis was mainly of Graeco-Roman influence at the time, Egyptian culture was still being used in some of their everyday lives.

Pottery itself from the workshops was also abundant, but compared to the figurines, it was simple in design. Made from either clay or terracotta, jugs that were Greek in design but clumsily crafted are found throughout the middle Ptolemaic era. Most of the jugs were large in design, but smaller, more sophisticated in design, were also found. No matter how the pottery was made, floral decorations were found on almost all the finished and unfinished artifacts. Clay molds were also found in the middle Ptolemaic era. They were circular in design with a sunken relief on one side. There was one artifact found from the early Ptolemaic era that was made from limestone, however the rest of the molds were made from clay.

== See also ==
- Pyramid of Athribis – a now–destroyed pyramid located in Athribis.
- Athribis (Upper Egypt)
- List of ancient Egyptian towns and cities
- List of ancient Egyptian sites, including sites of temples

== Bibliography ==
- Mysliwiec, Karol (1992). "Polish-Egyptian Excavations at Tell Atrib in 1991". Polish Archaeology in the Mediterranean. 3: 24–28.
- Mysliwiec, Karol (2013). "Archaeology Meeting Geophysics on Polish Excavations in Egypt". Studia Quarternaria. 30 (2): 45–59.
- Mysliwiec, Karol; Poludnikiewicz, Anna (2003). "A Center of Ceramic Production in Ptolemaic Athribis". Contributions of the University of California Archaeological Research Facility. The George and Mary Foster Anthropology Library. pp. 133–152.
- Petrie, William Matthew Flinders; Walker, J. H.; Knobel, Edward Ball (1908). Athribis. School of archaeology in Egypt.
- Szymanska, Hanna (1999). "Tell Atrib: Excavations, 1998". Polish Archaeology in the Mediterranean. 10: 71–76.
- Szymanska, Hanna (2000). "Tell Atrib: Excavations, 1999". Polish Archaeology in the Mediterranean. 11: 77–82.
