= Zawyet el-Maiyitin =

- Location in Egypt
- Coordinates: 28°03′N 30°49′E
- Country: Egypt
- Governorate: Minya Governorate
- Time zone: UTC+2 (EET)
  - Summer (DST): UTC+3 (EEST)

Zawyet el-Maiyitin or Zawyet Sultan or Zawyet el-Amwat is a small village in Egypt, located in the Minya Governorate.

The site has the Pyramid of Zawyet el-Maiyitin of the late 3rd Dynasty, remarkable for being the only pyramid built on the east bank of the Nile. It also comprises rock-cut tombs of the late Old Kingdom. Its ancient name was Hebenu.
