= Djefatnebti =

Ancient Egyptian queen consort

Djefatnebti in hieroglyphs
G16 I10 I9 G1 t B7
Djefatnebti
Ḏf3t(.j) Nbty
(My) food are the Two Ladies

Djefatnebti (also Djefatnebty) was an ancient Egyptian queen consort. She lived at the end of the 3rd Dynasty and may have been a wife of the last king of that dynasty, Huni.

== Identity ==
Djefatnebti’s name appears in one single, black ink inscription on an earthen beer jar, which was excavated at the eastern corner of Elephantine. Altogether three inscriptions were found. The first one mentions the "year of the followers of Horus" and the foundation of a building which name is lost due to damage. The second one mentions the "year of the 2nd time of the followers of Horus" and an "11th time of counting-the-fields at Heliopolis". The third one contains the notation "The king of Upper- and Lower Egypt appears", a "3rd time of battling the robbers" and the death of Djefatnebti. Since the "counting of the fields" was performed as a tax collection every second year, the one beer jar inscription dates into the 22nd year of rulership of the unnamed king. The death of Djefatnebti might therefore have occurred shortly before or shortly after the creation of the inscription.

== Datation ==
The inscription assigns to Djefatnebti the female title "Weret-hetes" (meaning "the great one of the Hetes sceptre"), which was a common title for queens of the Old Kingdom period. Thus it is at least secure that Djefatnebti was a queen of the late 3rd dynasty. Egyptologist Günter Dreyer is convinced, that Djefatnebti was married to Huni, since no other king of the 3rd dynasty is proven to have ruled longer than 22 years. His theory is not commonly accepted, though, because the ink inscription doesn't mention Huni by name.

== Tomb ==
Djefatnebti's burial is unknown.
