= Meresankh I =

Egyptian queen consort

- Spouse: Huni?
- Children: Sneferu

Meresankh I ("She loves life") was an ancient Egyptian kingʻs wife and the mother of King Sneferu. She may have been a wife of King Huni, the last king of the 3rd Dynasty.

Meresankh I in hieroglyphs
mr s anx
Meresankh
Mr-s-ˁnḫ

Meresankh Iʻs name appears on a fragment of the Palermo Stone and an estate of Meresankh may be named in the tomb of Pehernefer in Saqqara. She is named alongside her son Sneferu in graffiti in the pyramid temple at Meidum. This graffiti dates to the reign of Tuthmosis III of the 18th Dynasty. The text recites a hetep di nesu (offerings) text for the ka of King Sneferu and Queen Meresankh.
