= Pyramid of Naqada =

Egyptian pyramid

- Location within Egypt
- 25°58′35.4″N 32°43′58.8″E
- Owner: Owner uncertain, possibly Huni
- Constructed: Third Dynasty ?
- Type: Step pyramid
- Material: limestone
- Height: 4.50 m (current)
- Base: 18.39 m

The pyramid of Naqada, also called the pyramid of Ombos, is part of a group of seven very similar small step pyramids, which were all erected far from the major centres of Egypt and about which very little is known. It is located about 300 metres north of the ruins of the ancient site of Ombos, near the modern city of Naqada in Upper Egypt. The first (and so far only) excavation was undertaken in 1895 by Flinders Petrie and James Edward Quibell.

== Description ==
The pyramid measures 18.39 metres on each side and currently is about 4.5 metres tall. It is not oriented to true north, but 12° to the northeast – in parallel with the course of the Nile. The pyramid consists of a core which measures about 5.75 metres on each side, around which three layers of roughly hewen stone were placed. The structure may have originally consisted of three steps. Locally sourced limestone was used as the building material. Under the southwest corner, Petrie discovered a grave measuring 1.25 by 2.00 metres, which very likely does not belong to the pyramid. It is much more likely that it is a secondary burial.

== Construction and purpose ==
The builder and purpose of the pyramid are unknown. Günter Dreyer and Werner Kaiser considered it and the other six pyramids of this group to be a cohesive building project of Pharaoh Huni, the last ruler of the Third Dynasty. Andrzej Ćwiek sees things similarly, but prefers Huni's successor, Snofru (c.2670-2620 BC), the first ruler of the Fourth Dynasty, as the builder. Theories about the purpose of this and the other pyramids range from a site of royal representation, to a depiction of the benben stone, a symbol of the political and religious unity of the land, or a monument for a royal wife.

== See also ==
- List of Egyptian pyramids
- Egyptian pyramid construction techniques

== Bibliography ==
- Jan Bock. "Die kleinen Stufenpyramiden des frühen Alten Reiches." In: Sokar, No. 12 (1/2006), pp. 20–29.
- Andrzej Ćwiek. "Date and Function of the so-called Minor Step Pyramids." Göttinger Miszellen Vol. 162, Göttingen 1998, pp. 39–52.
- Günter Dreyer, Werner Kaiser. "Zu den kleinen Stufenpyramiden Ober- und Mittelägyptens." Mitteilungen des Deutschen Archäologischen Instituts, Abteilung Kairo (MDAIK) 36, Zabern, Mainz 1980, pp. 46f.
- Mark Lehner. Das Geheimnis der Pyramiden in Ägypten. Orbis, München 1999, ISBN 357201039X, p. 96
- William Matthew Flinders Petrie, James Edward Quibell: Naqada and Ballas. London 1896, p. 65, Pl. Ia, LXXXV (PDF; 8,6 MB)
- Ali Radwan. "Die Stufenpyramiden." In Zahi Hawass (Ed.): Die Schätze der Pyramiden. Weltbild, Augsburg 2004, ISBN 3828908098, p. 111
- Miroslav Verner. Die Pyramiden. Rowohlt, Reinbek 1998, ISBN 3499608901, S. 197
