= Toby Wilkinson =

English Egyptologist (born 1969)

Toby Wilkinson FSA FRHistS
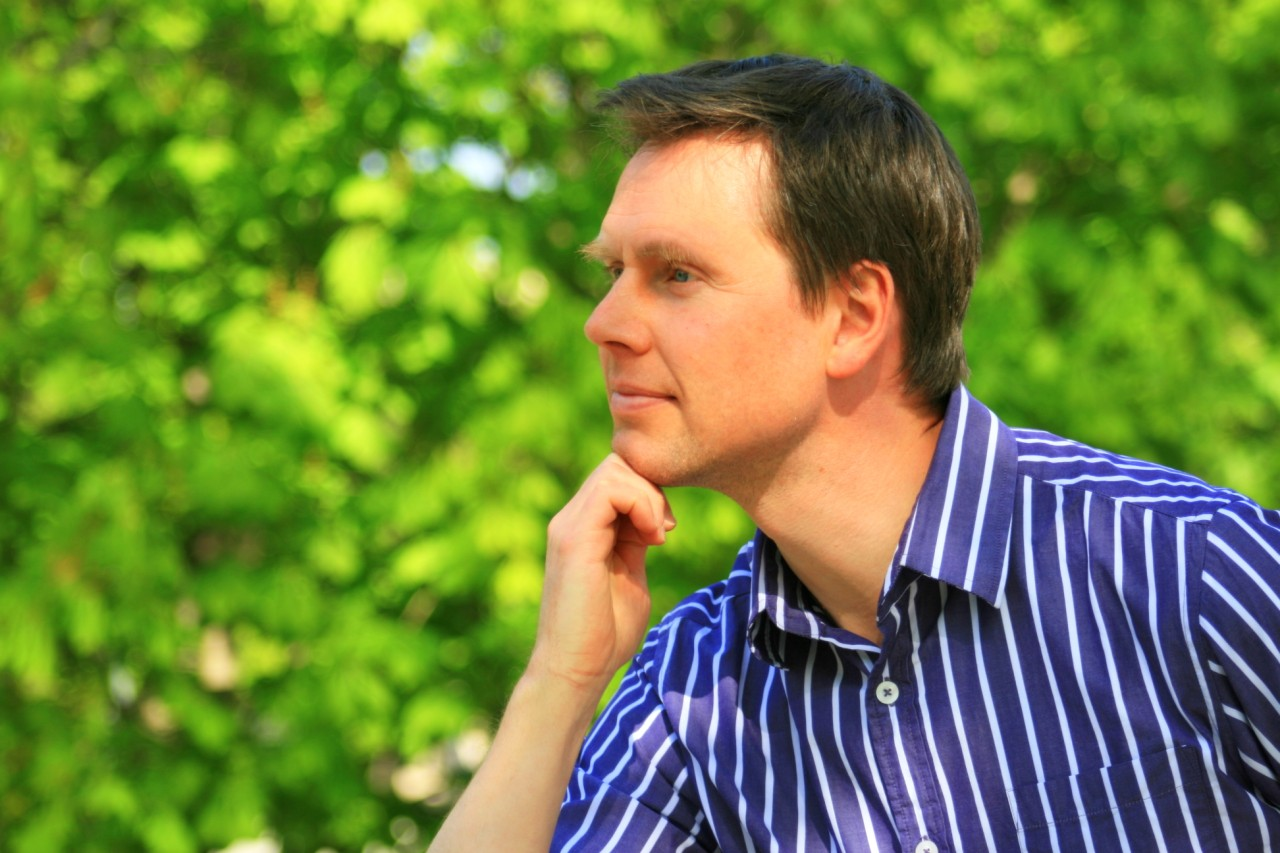
- Born: 1969 (age 56–57)
- Awards: Hessell-Tiltman Prize (2011)

Academic background
- Education: Downing College, Cambridge; Christ's College, Cambridge

Academic work
- Discipline: Egyptology
- Institutions: Christ's College, Cambridge; University of Durham; Clare College, Cambridge; University of Lincoln; Fiji National University
- Website: www.tobywilkinson.net

Toby Alexander Howard Wilkinson, FSA, FRHistS (born 1969) is an English Egyptologist and academic. After studying Egyptology at the University of Cambridge, he was Lady Wallis Budge Research Fellow in Egyptology at Christ's College, Cambridge (1993 to 1997) and then a research fellow at the University of Durham (1997 to 1999). He became a Fellow of Clare College, Cambridge in 2003. He was Deputy Vice Chancellor (External Relations) at the University of Lincoln from 2017 to 2021, and then Vice Chancellor of Fiji National University from January 2021 to December 2021. Since 2022, he has been Fellow for Development at Clare College, Cambridge.

Wilkinson was awarded the 2011 Hessell-Tiltman Prize for his book The Rise and Fall of Ancient Egypt: the History of a Civilisation from 3000 BC to Cleopatra.

== Early life ==
Wilkinson was born in 1969. He read Egyptology at Downing College, Cambridge. He graduated with a first class Bachelor of Arts (BA) degree, and was awarded the Thomas Mulvey Egyptology Prize. He completed his Doctor of Philosophy (PhD) degree at Christ's College, Cambridge in 1993, with a doctoral thesis titled "Egypt in transition: predynastic-early dynastic chronology and the effects of state formation".

== Academic career ==
Wilkinson's first academic position, from 1993 to 1997, was as Lady Wallis Budge Research Fellow in Egyptology at Christ's College, Cambridge. From 1997 to 1999, he was Leverhulme Special Research Fellow at the University of Durham. After this he decided to change direction from academia.

Wilkinson returned to Cambridge and became a Fellow of Clare College, Cambridge in 2003. He set up the college's development office, focusing on communications, fundraising and external relations, and served as director of development from 2003 to 2010. He is a member of the editorial board of the Journal of Egyptian History. He is an honorary research fellow in the Department of Archaeology, University of Durham. In July 2011, he became head of the International Strategy Office at the University of Cambridge. In this position, he developed the university's international strategy and helped facilitate international collaborations.

In 2017, he became Deputy Vice Chancellor (External Relations) at the University of Lincoln. In January 2021, he moved to the South Pacific to become Vice Chancellor of Fiji National University. However, in August 2021, it was announced that he was to step down in December 2021 due to "personal family reasons", and he subsequently returned to the United Kingdom. In March 2022, it was announced that he would return to Clare College, Cambridge as Fellow for Development: he took up the appointment on 3 May 2022. He was appointed as the bursar of Clare college in February 2025.

== Honours ==
In 2011, Wilkinson won the Hessell-Tiltman Prize, awarded to the best work of non-fiction of historical content, for his book The Rise and Fall of Ancient Egypt: the History of a Civilisation from 3000 BC to Cleopatra.

On 3 March 2017, Wilkinson was elected a Fellow of the Society of Antiquaries of London (FSA). He is also a Fellow of the Royal Historical Society.

== Selected works ==
- A New Comparative Chronology for the Predynastic-Early Dynastic Transition Journal of the Ancient Chronology Forum (JACF) 7, 1995, pp. 5–26
- State Formation in Egypt: Chronology and Society (1996), British Archaeological Reports (BAR) International
- Early Dynastic Egypt (1999), Routledge
- Royal Annals of Ancient Egypt: the Palermo Stone and Its Associated Fragments (2000), Kegan Paul
- Genesis of the Pharaohs: Dramatic New Discoveries That Rewrite the Origins of Ancient Egypt (2003), Thames & Hudson
- The Thames and Hudson Dictionary of Ancient Egypt (2nd edition 2008), Thames & Hudson
- Lives of the Ancient Egyptians: Pharaohs, Queens, Courtiers and Commoners (2007)
- (Editor) The Egyptian World (2009), Routledge
- The Rise and Fall of Ancient Egypt (2010). Published by Bloomsbury (UK) on 2 August 2010 and by Random House (USA) on 15 March 2011
- The Nile: A Journey Downriver Through Egypt's Past and Present (2014), Knopf
- UCLA Encyclopedia of Egyptology, Dynasties 2 and 3, UCLA Encyclopedia of Egyptology, 1(1), 2014
- Aristocrats and Archaeologists: An Edwardian Journey on the Nile (2017), The American University in Cairo Press
- A World Beneath the Sands: The Golden Age of Egyptology (2020), W. W. Norton
- Tutankhamun's Trumpet: The Story of Ancient Egypt in 100 Objects (2022), Pan MacMillan
- Ramesses the Great: Egypt's King of Kings (2023), Yale University Press
- The Last Dynasty: Ancient Egypt from Alexander the Great to Cleopatra (2025), W. W. Norton
