= Pyramid of Sinki =

Step pyramid

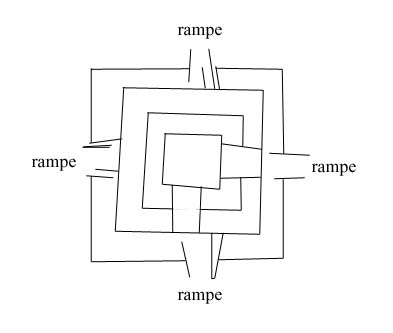
- Illustration of the Pyramid of Sinki and its construction ramps
- Interactive map of Pyramid of Sinki
- Type: Mastaba
- Location: Abydos, Egypt

History
- Built: Third Dynasty of Egypt (c. 2686 BC–c. 2613 BC)

Site notes
- Owner: Huni

Pyramid of Sinki is a small, layered step pyramid located approximately 5.5 km southeast of the Temple of Seti I and in Abydos, eighth nome in Upper Egypt. It was built on a sand surface, which was common for several layer step pyramids in ancient Egypt.

The pyramid is attributed to Pharaoh Huni, likely a mastaba (ancient Egyptian tomb), is made of limestone, aligned with the Nile River, and features mudbrick ramps. There are 14 similar pyramids near it.

The pyramid is believed to date back to the Third Dynasty of Egypt (c. 2686 BC–c. 2613 BC). It was built from rough stone blocks and lacks the uniform casing found on other pyramids, resembling structures like those at El Amrah. The pyramid was largely forgotten until renewed interest emerged in 1977, when it became part of a broader study of Egypt's "Minor Step Pyramids".

== History ==
The pyramid is believed to have been built during the Third Dynasty of Egypt, likely attributed to Pharaoh Huni. Like other minor step pyramids, it likely had symbolic significance related to the Egyptian calendar and Egyptian astronomy, one of many beliefs of ancient Egypt.

The pyramid was built with limestone, a type of carbonate sedimentary rock found in many architectural types. It was also built in Abydos, one of the oldest cities of ancient Egypt and the eighth nome in Upper Egypt.

=== Construction ===
Brick markers were discovered at the site, serving as reference points for orientation, alignments, inclination, and other building features. Four construction ramps were found at the pyramid, one on each side, as well as others in the middle. These ramps started from the desert surface and leaned onto the core of the pyramid.

The estimated original height was about 12.5 meters, but according to archaeological research by Nabil Swelim, the Pyramid of Sinki was not fully finished. The first two layers were successfully completed, but neither a pavement nor an outer facing were constructed, leading to this conclusion.

When manual lifting of building materials was no longer possible, four ramps were erected on each side of the pyramid, but construction stopped at this point as well. At the western corner of Sinki, where the height of the ruin is greatest, there were 16 preserved courses of masonry in layer two at the time of investigation. This indicates that construction had progressed significantly but was not completed.

While the exact reason for abandonment is not completely known, it's likely that the short reign of the pharaoh who commissioned it (possibly Huni) led to the project being left unfinished.

=== Discovery ===
The Pyramid of Sinki was discovered by Nabil Swelim on October 27, 1977, with large-scale excavations beginning in 1980 in collaboration with Günter Dreyer, a German Egyptologist from the German Archaeological Institute in Cairo. Initially buried under debris, the pyramid was revealed as a step pyramid with three layers, built in a pit with faulty square orientations and unfinished ramps, suggesting the construction was incomplete. Archaeological research also revealed megalithic blocks beneath the pyramid, indicating possible underground structures that require further exploration, with ongoing studies as recent as 2018.
