= Pyramid of el-Kula =

Egyptian pyramid

Coordinates: 25°08′00″N 32°44′00″E

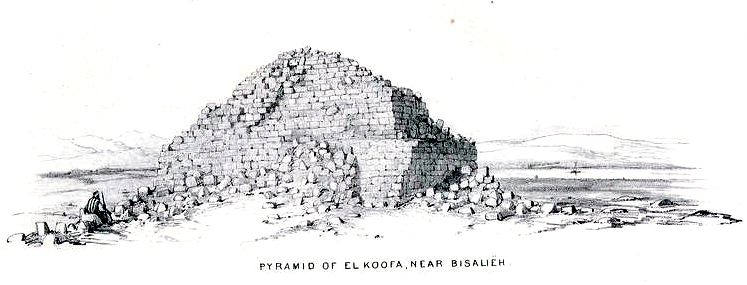
- 1842 drawing by Perring

Huni
- Constructed: 3rd Dynasty ?
- Type: Step pyramid
- Material: Limestone
- Height: 8.25 m
- Base: 18.60 m

The Pyramid of el-Kula, along with the pyramids in Edfu-South, Elephantine, Ombos, Zawyet el-Maiyitin, Seila, and Sinki, belongs to a group of seven very similar small step pyramids that were all built far away from the major centers of Egypt and about which very little is known. It is located approximately six kilometers north of the ancient site of Hierakonpolis near the village of Naga el-Mamariya. Of all the pyramids mentioned above, it is in the best state of preservation. It was first described in 1837 by John Shae Perring and Richard William Howard Vyse, who called it el-Koofa. A thorough excavation and examination of the structure was carried out in 1949 under the direction of the Belgian Egyptologist Jean Capart.

== Description ==
The pyramid consists of three steps and has a side length of 18.60 meters. Its height is still 8.25 meters today, although Perring and Vyse measured it in the mid-19th century at 11.75 meters. It consists of a core building with a side length of approximately 10.20 meters, around which two shells of 4.5 ells thickness each are arranged. A special feature of this pyramid is that its corners, and not its sides as is customary in Egyptian pyramids, are aligned with the cardinal directions. The explanation for this surely lies in the fact that its eastern side is oriented towards the course of the Nile, which flows here quite precisely to the northwest. The pyramid was constructed using locally sourced limestone as building material. The individual blocks are only roughly hewn and measure up to 60 by 100 cm. They are stacked in courses with an average thickness of 35 cm. A mixture of clay, Nile silt, sand and small limestone chips served as mortar.

On the northwest side there is a cut about eight meters deep, which was made at the end of the 19th century in an attempt to access a suspected burial chamber that was not present. It is unclear who made this cut, it has been attributed to Gaston Maspero, who excavated in el-Kula around 1900, as well as to Edouard Naville, who worked there in 1884. However, the cut can already be seen in a photo that was taken in 1882, according to Maspero's information.

== Function ==
The builder and function of the pyramid are unknown. Günter Dreyer and Werner Kaiser consider it, along with the other pyramids mentioned above, to be part of a cohesive building project by Pharaoh Huni, the last ruler of the 3rd Dynasty. Andrzej Ćwiek agrees but suspects Huni's successor Snofru (ca. 2670–2620 BCE), the founder of the 4th Dynasty, as the builder. Speculations about the function of the pyramids range from being a representation site of the king to a depiction of the primeval mound or a symbol of the political and religious unity of the country, to being cenotaphs of the royal consorts.

A completely different theory was proposed in 1994 by American Robert E. Womack. He sees the Pyramid of el-Kula as evidence of Mesopotamian influence on Egypt, basing this on the fact that the corners and not the sides of the pyramid are aligned with the cardinal directions, as is also the case with the Mesopotamian ziggurats. Although there were apparently quite intensive relations between the two cultures in the pre- and early dynastic period, Womack's theory did not find support among Egyptologists, since the orientation of the pyramid was very likely based on the course of the Nile, as is also the case with the other six pyramids in this group.

== Sources ==
- Jan Bock: Die kleinen Stufenpyramiden des frühen Alten Reiches. In: Sokar. Nr. 12, 1/ 2006, S. 20–29.
- Andrzej Ćwiek: Date and Function of the so-called Minor Step Pyramids. In: Göttinger Miszellen Bd. 162, Göttingen 1998, S. 39–52 (Online).
- Günter Dreyer und Werner Kaiser: Zu den kleinen Stufenpyramiden Ober- und Mittelägyptens. In: Mitteilungen des Deutschen Archäologischen Instituts, Abteilung Kairo. (MDAIK) Band 36, von Zabern, Mainz 1980, S. 45f.
- Mark Lehner: Das Geheimnis der Pyramiden in Ägypten. Orbis, München 1999, ISBN 3-572-01039-X, S. 96.
- John S. Perring, Samuel Birch, E. J. Andrews: The Pyramids of Gizeh. Band III, Fraser, London 1842.
- Ali Radwan: Die Stufenpyramiden. In: Zahi Hawass (Hrsg.): Die Schätze der Pyramiden. Weltbild, Augsburg 2004, ISBN 3-8289-0809-8, S. 111.
- Miroslav Verner: Die Pyramiden (= rororo-Sachbuch. Band 60890). Rowohlt, Reinbek bei Hamburg 1999, ISBN 3-499-60890-1, S. 198f.
- Robert E. Womack: The Pyramid at El Kula: Could it be additional evidence of early Mesopotamian influence? In: K.M.T.: a modern journal of ancient Egypt. (KMT) Nummer 5/ 2, San Francisco 1994, S. 65–69.
