= Rainer Stadelmann =

German Egyptologist (1933–2019)

Portrait of Rainer Stadelmann

Rainer Stadelmann (24 October 1933 – 14 January 2019) was a German Egyptologist. He was considered an expert on the archaeology of the Giza Plateau.

== Biography ==
After studying in Neuburg an der Donau in 1953, he studied Egyptology, orientalism, and archaeology at the Ludwig-Maximilians-Universität München. He participated in 1955 and 1956 in the excavations of the sun temple of the 5th Dynasty pharaoh Userkaf at Abusir. He continued his studies at Heidelberg University, where in 1960 he wrote his doctoral thesis on the Syrian-Palestinian deities in Egypt. He was a technical assistant at Heidelberg University until 1967, after which he became scientific director at the German Archaeological Institute in Cairo, where he served from 1989 to 1998.

Since 1975, he was an honorary professor at Heidelberg University. He participated in numerous excavations at Elephantine, Thebes, and Dahshur; at the latter, he explored and wrote about the Bent Pyramid and the valley temple of King Sneferu. He also opened a new exhibition at the Egyptian Museum, Cairo, to celebrate 40 years of archaeological work by the Japanese.

== Selected publications ==
- Die ägyptischen Pyramiden, vom Ziegelbau zum Weltwunder, Mayence, 1985–1997, éditions von Zabern (Kulturgeschichte der Antiken Welt, Bd. 30), ISBN 3-8053-1142-7
