= Göttinger Miszellen =

Cover of the journal Göttinger Miszellen (GM)

Göttinger Miszellen (abbreviated as GöMisz or GM) is a scientific journal published by the Seminar für Ägyptologie und Koptologie of the University of Göttingen,Germany which contains short scholarly articles on Egyptological, Coptological, and other related subjects.

Founded in 1972, its aim is to publish information about new discoveries and theories as quickly and efficiently as possible, and to be a forum for scholarly discussions on Egyptology. In line with this philosophy, GM is published at least four times a year, and contributors (who may submit articles in German, English or French) are required to submit camera-ready copy, as articles are reproduced photographically rather than being re-typed or loaded from diskette. Copy is not edited at all by the publishers and is the verbatim work of each author.

Each issue is approximately 112 pages in length and costs 4.50 euros. Back issues are only available from No. 47 (1981) onwards, as all earlier copies are out of print. The journal is identified as ISSN 0344-385X.
