= Third Dynasty of Egypt =

Dynasty of ancient Egypt (Old Kingdom)

- c. 2686 BC–c. 2613 BC
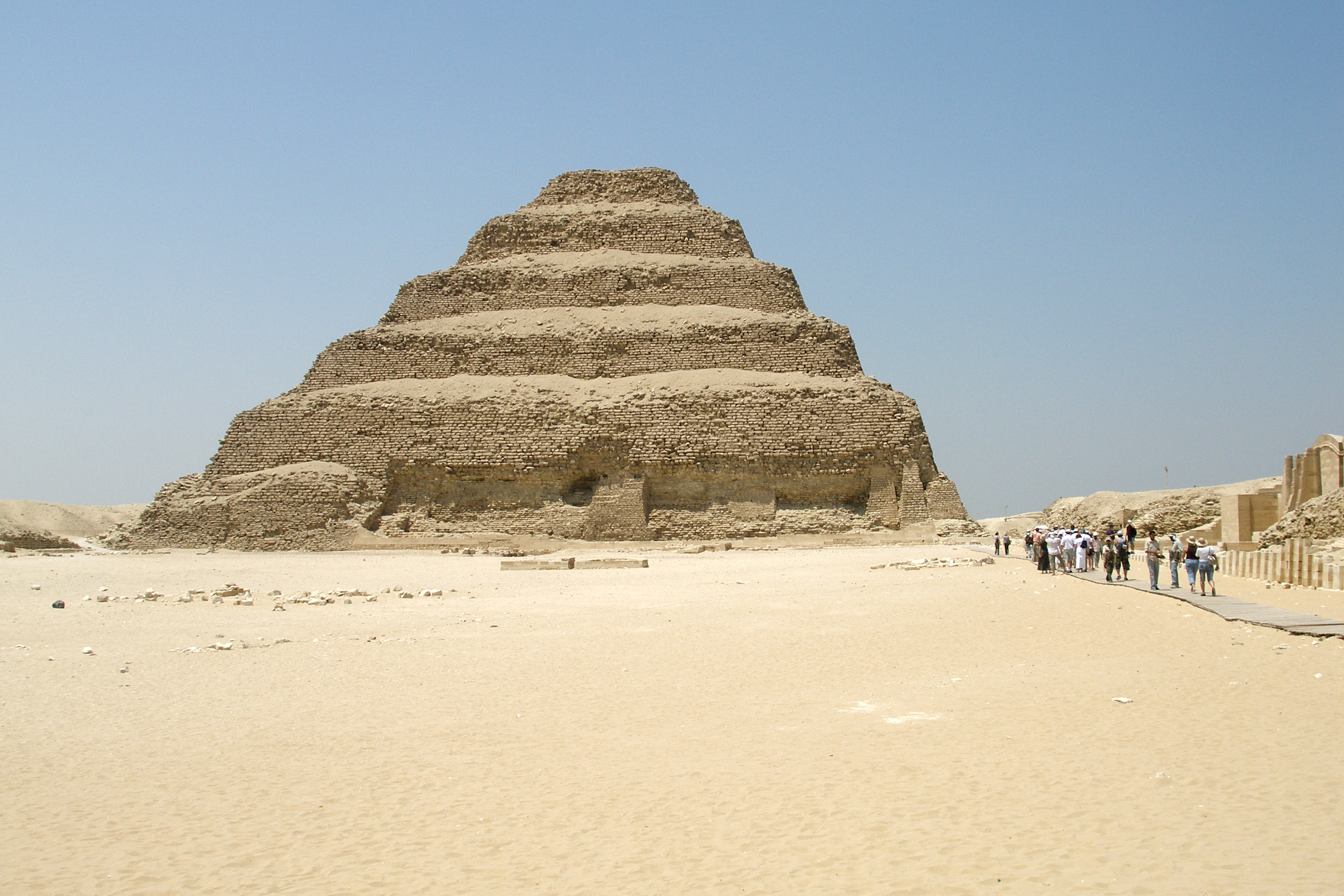
- Pyramid of Djoser at Saqqara
- Capital: Memphis
- Common languages: Egyptian language
- Religion: ancient Egyptian religion
- Government: Absolute monarchy
- Historical era: Bronze Age
  - Established: c. 2686 BC
  - Disestablished: c. 2613 BC
Preceded by	Succeeded by
Second Dynasty of Egypt	Fourth Dynasty of Egypt

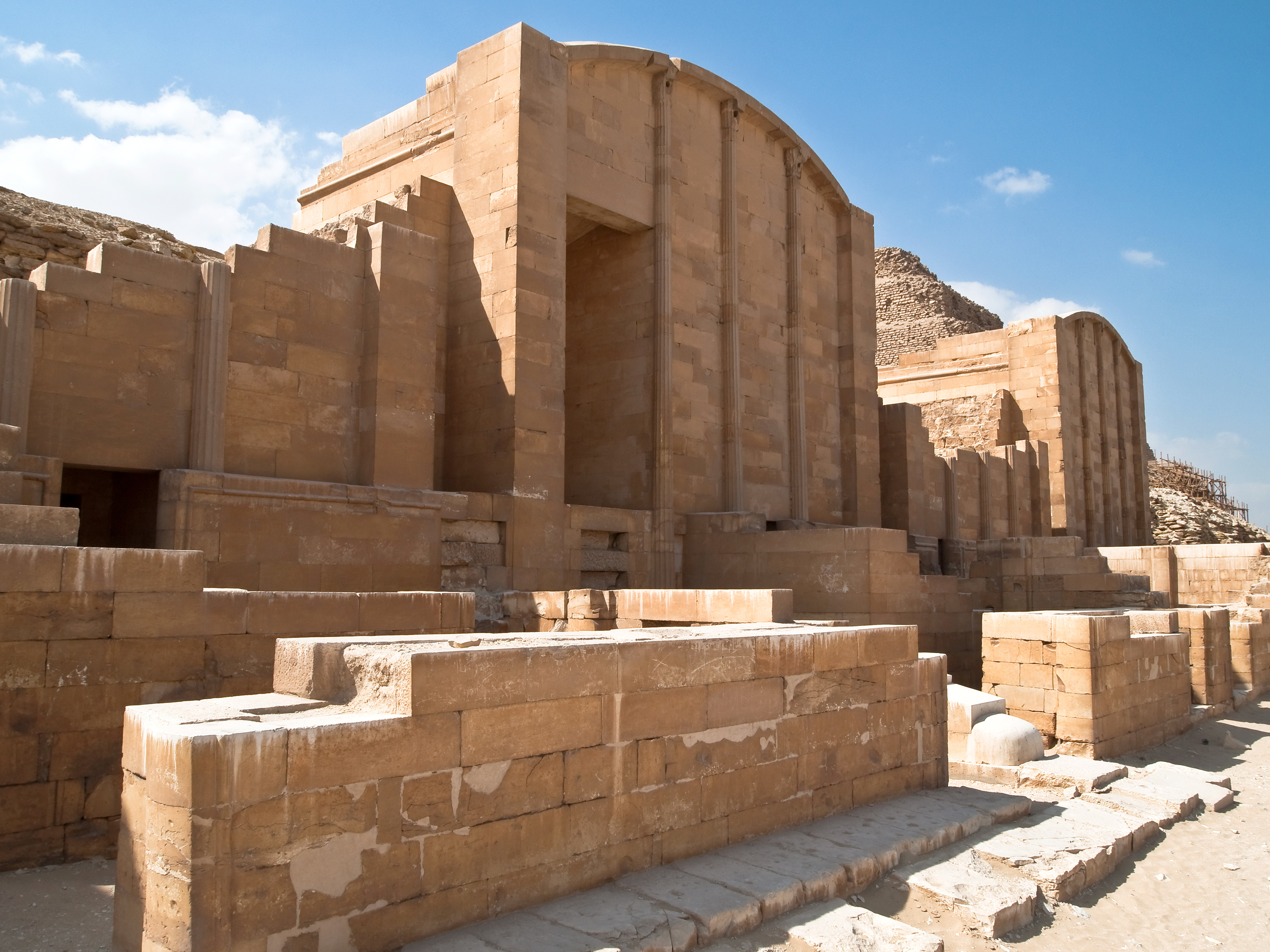
Heb-sed court chapels in Djoser's pyramid complex at Saqqara

The Third Dynasty of ancient Egypt (Dynasty III) is the first dynasty of the Old Kingdom. Other dynasties of the Old Kingdom include the Fourth, Fifth and Sixth. The capital during the period of the Old Kingdom was at Memphis.

== Overview ==
After the turbulent last years of the Second Dynasty, which might have included civil war, Egypt came under the rule of Djoser, marking the beginning of the Third Dynasty. Both the Turin King List and the Abydos King List record five kings, while the Saqqara Tablet only records four, and Manetho records nine, many of whom did not exist or are simply the same king under multiple names.

- The Turin King List gives Nebka, Djoser, Djoserti, Hudjefa I, and Huni.
- The Abydos King List gives Nebka, Djoser, Teti, Sedjes, and Neferkare.
- The Saqqara Tablet gives Djoser, Djoserteti, Nebkare, and Huni.
- Manetho gives Necheróphes (Nebka), Tosorthrós (Djoser/Netjerikhet), Týreis (Djoserti/Sekhemkhet), Mesôchris (Sanakht, probably the same person as Nebka), Sôÿphis (also Djoser/Netjerikhet), Tósertasis (also Djoserti/Sekhemkhet), Kerpherês (Nebtawy Nebkare; unlikely Khaba, perhaps nonexistent), Sêphuris (Qahedjet), and Achês (Huni).

The archaeological evidence shows that Khasekhemwy, the last ruler of the Second Dynasty, was succeeded by Djoser, who at the time was only attested by his presumed Horus name Netjerikhet. Djoser's successor was Sekhemkhet, who had the Nebty name Djeserty. The last king of the dynasty is Huni, who may be the same person as Qahedjet or, less likely, Khaba. There are three remaining Horus names of known 3rd dynasty kings: Sanakht, Khaba, and perhaps Qahedjet. One of these three, by far most likely Sanakht, went by the nebty name Nebka.

Dating the Third Dynasty is similarly challenging. Shaw gives the dates as being approximately from 2686 to 2613 BC. The Turin King List suggests a total of 75 years for the third dynasty. Baines and Malek have placed the third dynasty as spanning the years 2650–2575 BC, while Dodson and Hilton date the dynasty to 2584–2520 BC. It is not uncommon for these estimates to differ by more than a century.

== Rulers ==
The pharaohs of the Third Dynasty ruled for approximately 75 years. Due to recent archaeological findings in Abydos revealing that Djoser was the one who buried Khasekhemwy, the last king of the Second Dynasty, it is now widely believed that Djoser is the founder of the Third Dynasty, as the direct successor of Khasekhemwy and the one responsible for finishing his tomb. These findings contradict earlier writings, like Wilkinson 1999, which proposed that Nebka/Sanakht was the founder of the dynasty. However, the two were not very far apart temporally; they may have been brothers, along with Sekhemkhet, as the sons of Khasekhemwy and his favoured consort Nimaathap.

Dynasty III pharaohs
Personal Name	Horus-name	Regnal years	Burial	Consort(s)
Djoser	Netjerikhet	19 or 28	Saqqara: Pyramid of Djoser	Hetephernebti
Djoserty	Sekhemkhet	6–7	Saqqara: Buried Pyramid	Djeseretnebti
Nebka	Sanakht	6–28 years, depending on identification; most likely 6, 18, or 19 years	Possibly mastaba K2 at Beit Khallaf	
(unknown)	Khaba	6 ? 24, if identical to Huni	Zawyet el'Aryan: Layer Pyramid	
Huni	Uncertain, Qahedjet ?	24	Uncertain	Djefatnebti; Meresankh I

While Manetho names Necherophes, and the Turin King List names Nebka (a.k.a. Sanakht), as the first pharaoh of the Third Dynasty, many contemporary Egyptologists believe Djoser was the first king of this dynasty, pointing out the order in which some predecessors of Khufu are mentioned in the Papyrus Westcar suggests that Nebka should be placed between Djoser and Huni, and not before Djoser. More importantly, seals naming Djoser were found at the entrance to Khasekhemwy's tomb at Abydos, which demonstrates that it was Djoser, rather than Sanakht, who buried and succeeded Khasekhemwy, who was the final king of the Second Dynasty. The Turin King List scribe wrote Djoser's name in red ink, which indicates the Ancient Egyptians' recognition of this king's historical importance in their culture. In any case, Djoser is the best known king of this dynasty, for commissioning his vizier Imhotep to build the earliest surviving pyramids, the Step Pyramid.

Osirian statues of Djoser found in Heb-sed courtyard at Djoser´s Pyramid Complex in Saqqara

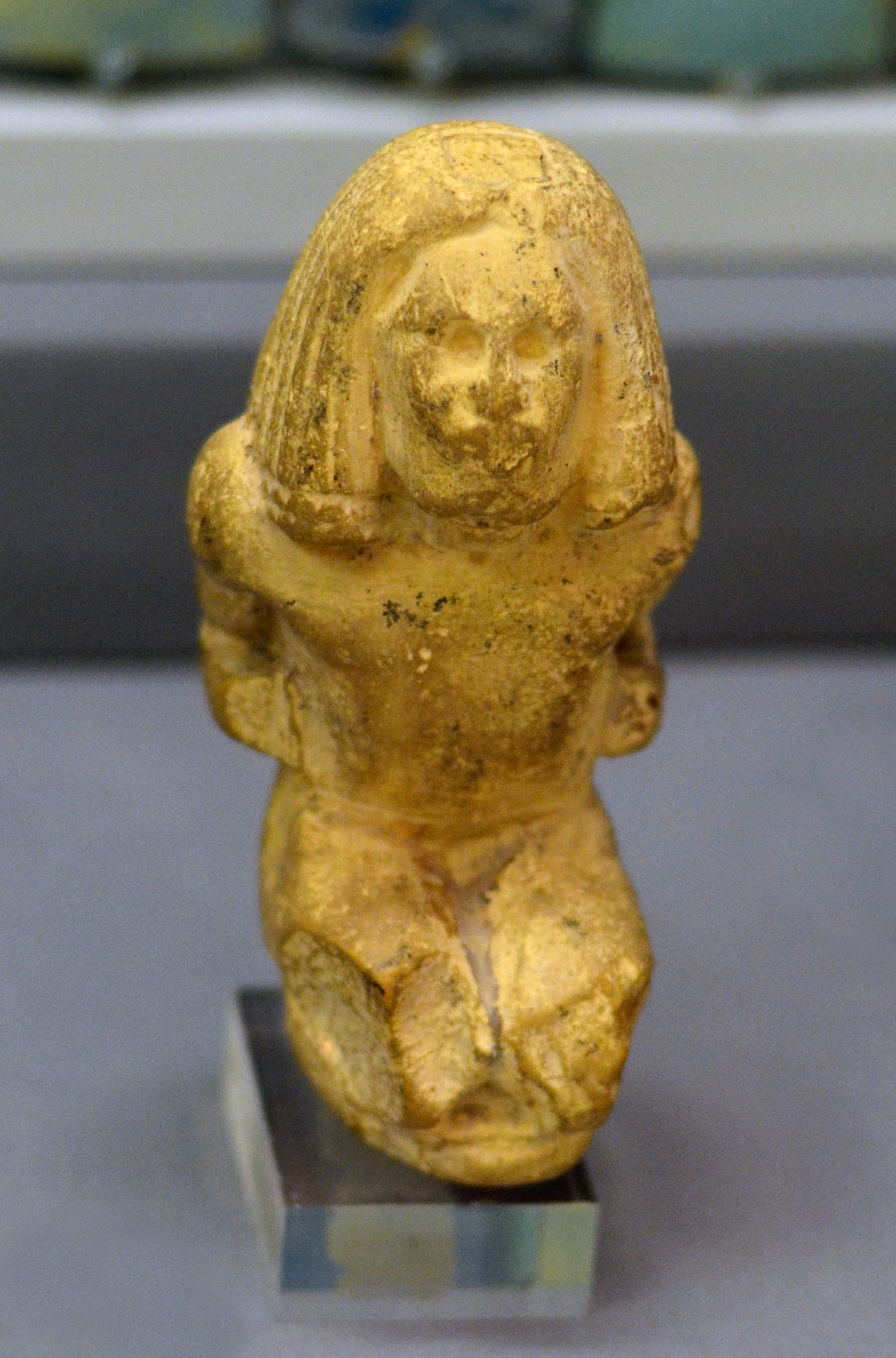
Limestone figure of a prisoner, 3rd Dynasty. Fitzwilliam Museum, Cambridge, E.5.1972

Nebka's identification with Sanakht is uncertain; though many Egyptologists continue to support the theory that the two kings were one and the same man, opposition exists because this opinion rests on a single fragmentary clay seal discovered in 1903 by John Garstang. Though damaged, the seal displays the serekh of Sanakht, together with a cartouche containing a form of the sign for "ka," with just enough room for the sign for "Neb." Nebka's reign length is given as eighteen years by both Manetho and the Turin Canon, though these sources write over 2,300 and 1,400 years after his lifetime, so their accuracy is uncertain. In contrast to Djoser, both Sanakht and Nebka are attested in considerably few relics for a ruler of nearly two decades; the Turin Canon gives a reign of only six years to an unnamed immediate predecessor of Huni. Toby Wilkinson suggests that this number fits Sanakht (whom he identifies concretely with Nebka), given the sparsity of archaeological evidence for him, but it could also be the reign length of Khaba or even Qahedjet, kings whose identities are uncertain. (Wilkinson places Nebka as the penultimate king of the Third Dynasty, before Huni, but this is by no means definitively known or even overwhelmingly supported among Egyptologists.)

Some authorities believe that Imhotep lived into the reign of the Pharaoh Huni. Little is known for certain of Sekhemkhet, but his reign is considered to have been only six or seven years, according to the Turin Canon and Palermo Stone, respectively. Attempts to equate Sekhemkhet with Tosertasis, a king assigned nineteen years by Manetho, find almost no support given the unfinished state of his tomb, the Buried Pyramid. It is believed that Khaba possibly built the Layer Pyramid at Zawyet el'Aryan; the pyramid is far smaller than it was intended to be, but it is not known whether this is due to natural erosion or because it, like Sekhemkhet's own tomb, was never completed to begin with. In any case, the duration of Khaba's reign is uncertain; a few Egyptologists believe Khaba was identical to Huni, but if Khaba is the same person as the Ramesside names Hudjefa II and Sedjes, he could have reigned for six years.

== Comparison of regnal lists ==
Djoser is widely considered by Egyptologists to be the first Pharaoh of this dynasty. However, historical king lists had a different order of reigns to the commonly accepted order in the modern day. The table below lists the names used for different kings and numbers them in the order they appear on each list. Manetho's Aegyptiaca listed four additional kings who are not recorded on earlier surviving king lists and the reason for this is unknown.

Historical Pharaoh	Abydos King List	Saqqara Tablet	Turin King List	Manetho	Years of rule	
Historical Pharaoh	Abydos King List	Saqqara Tablet	Turin King List	Manetho	Turin List	Manetho
Djoser	Djeser-za (2)	Djoser (1)	Djoser-it (2)	Tosorthros (2)	19 + 1 month	29
Sekhemkhet	Teti (3)	Djoser-teti (2)	Djoser-ti (3)	Tyreis (3)	6	7
Sanakht	Nebka (1)	Nebkara (3)	Nebka (1)	Necherophes (1)	19	28
Khaba	Sedjes (4)	–	Hudjefa (4)	Kerpheres? (9)	6	26
Huni	Neferkara (5)	Huni (4)	Huni (5)	Aches? (7)	24	42
–	–	–	–	Mesochris (4)	–	17
–	–	–	–	Soyphis (5)	–	16
–	–	–	–	Tosertasis (6)	–	19
–	–	–	–	Sephouris (8)	–	30

== Bio-anthropological affinities ==
Some scholars have proposed a southern origin for the Third Dynasty. Egyptologist, Flinders Petrie believed the dynasty originated from Sudan based on the iconographic evidence whereas S.O.Y. Keita, a biological anthropologist, differed in his view and argued an origin in southern Egypt was “equally likely”.He cited a previous X-ray and anthropological study which suggested that the Third Dynasty nobles had “Nubian affinities”. The author also interpreted the portrait of Djoser as having little resemblance to “portraits of late dynastic Greek/Roman conquerors” and cited an iconographic review conducted by anthropologist, John Drake as supporting evidence.In a separate article, Keita noted that the archaeological remains of the southern elites and their descendants which he discussed in reference to the Second Dynastic rulers and Djoser were eventually buried in the north and not at Abydos, Egypt.

== Third/Fourth dynasty genetics ==
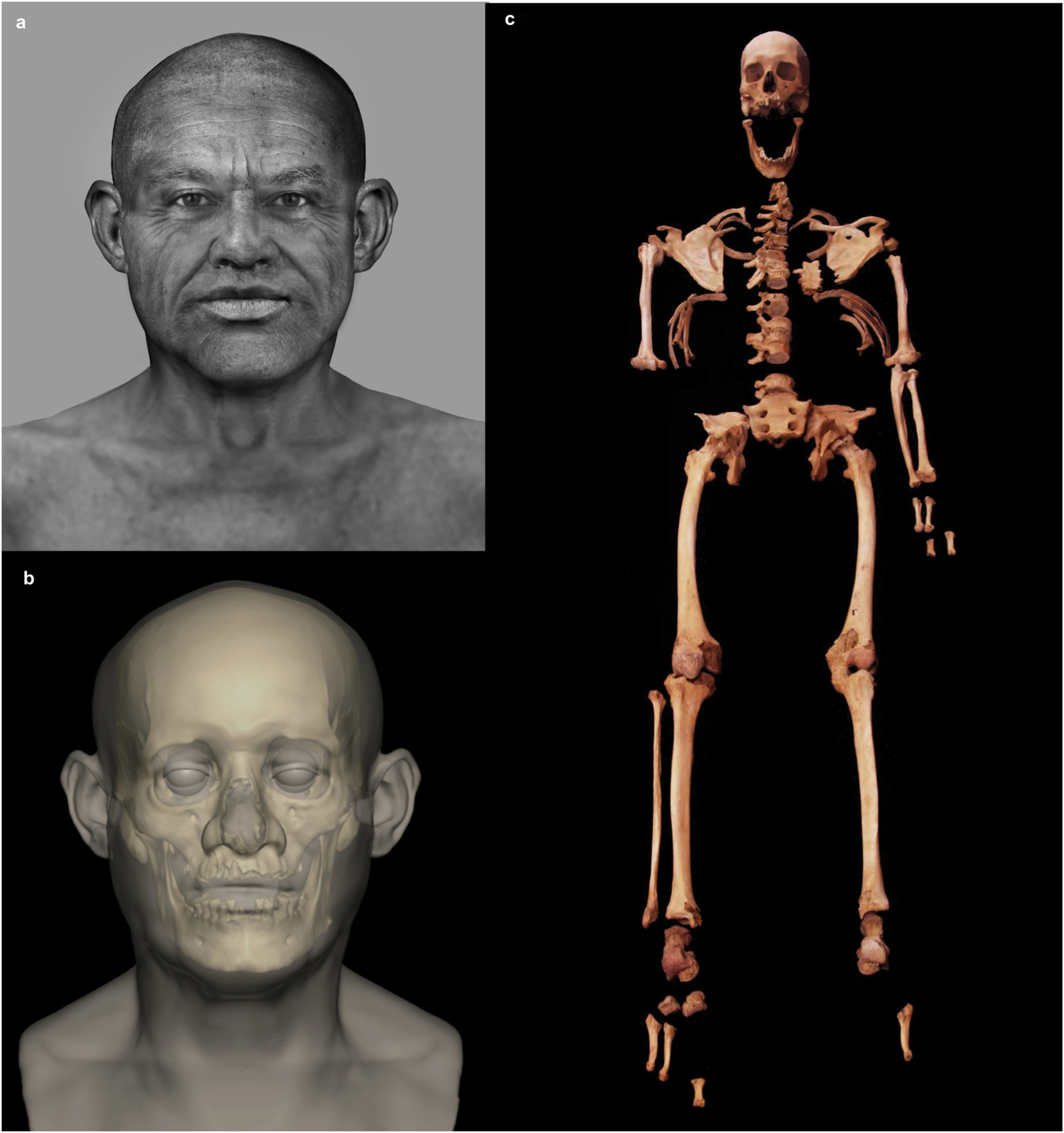
Facial reconstruction and depiction created from the Nuwayrat individual skull.

For the first time, in a 2025 publication by the scientific journal Nature, a whole-genome genetic study was able to give insights into the genetic background of an Old Kingdom individual, by sequencing the whole genome of an Old Kingdom adult male Egyptian of relatively high-status, radiocarbon-dated to 2855–2570 BC, with funerary practices archeologically attributed to the Third and Fourth Dynasty, which was excavated in Nuwayrat (Nuerat, نويرات), in a cliff 265 km south of Cairo. Before this study, whole-genome sequencing of ancient Egyptians from the early periods of Egyptian Dynastic history had not yet been accomplished, mainly because of the problematic DNA preservation conditions in Egypt.

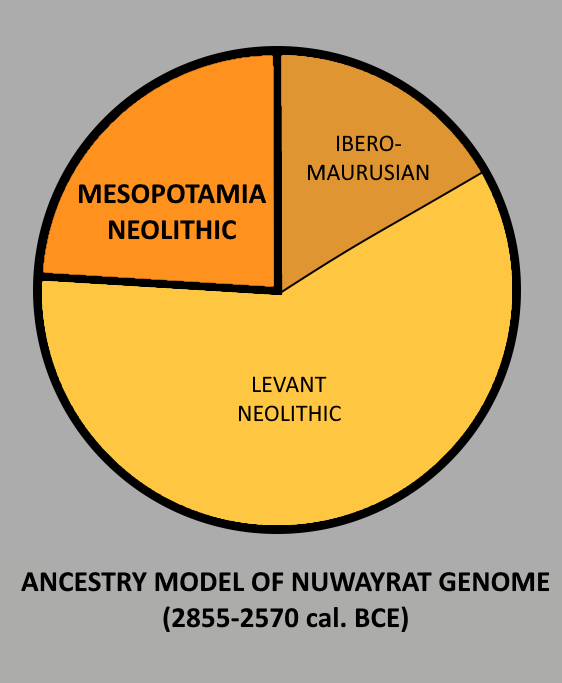
Ancestry model of Egyptian genome from Nuwayrat.

The corpse had been placed intact in a large circular clay pot without embalming, and then installed inside a cliff tomb, which accounts for the comparatively good level of conservation of the skeleton and its DNA. Most of his genome was found to be associated with North African Neolithic ancestry, but about 20% of his genetic ancestry could be sourced to the eastern Fertile Crescent, including Mesopotamia. The genetic profile was most closely represented by a two-source model, in which 77.6% ± 3.8% of the ancestry corresponded to genomes from the Middle Neolithic Moroccan site of Skhirat-Rouazi (dated to 4780–4230 BC), which itself consists of predominantly (76.4 ± 4.0%) Levant Neolithic ancestry and (23.6 ± 4.0%) minor Iberomaurusian ancestry, while the remainder (22.4% ± 3.8%) was most closely related to known genomes from Neolithic Mesopotamia (dated to 9000-8000 BC). Genomes from the Neolithic/Chalcolithic Levant only appeared as a minor third-place component in three-source models. A 2022 DNA study had already shown evidence of gene flow from the Mesopotamian and Zagros regions into surrounding areas, including Anatolia, during the Neolithic, but not as far as Egypt yet.

In terms of chronology, Egypt was one of the first areas to adopt the Neolithic package emerging from West Asia as early as the 6th millennium BC. Population genetics in the Nile Valley observed a marked change around this period, as shown by odontometric and dental tissue changes. Cultural exchange and trade between the two regions then continued through the 4th millennium BC, as shown by the transfer of Mesopotamian Late Uruk period features to the Nile Valley of the later Predynastic Period. Migrations flows from Mesopotamia accompanied such cultural exchanges, possibly through the sea routes of the Mediterranean and the Red Sea or through yet un-sampled intermediaries in the Levant, which could explain the relative smallness of genetic influence from known Chalcolithic/Bronze Age Levantines populations.

Overall, the 2025 study "provides direct evidence of genetic ancestry related to the eastern Fertile Crescent in ancient Egypt". This genetic connection suggests that there had been ancient migration flows from the eastern Fertile Crescent to Egypt, in addition to the exchanges of objects and imagery (domesticated animals and plants, writing systems...) already observed. This suggests a pattern of wide cultural and demographic expansion from the Mesopotamian region, which affected both Anatolia and Egypt during this period.

The authors acknowledged some limitations of the study such as the results deriving from one single Egyptian genome and that DNA analysis whilst indicative of population origin does not provide any evidence in relation to skin colour or facial hair.

== Third Dynasty timeline ==
Preceded by Second Dynasty	Dynasties of Egypt c. 2686–2613 BCE	Succeeded by Fourth Dynasty
