= Günter Dreyer =

German Egyptologist (1943–2019)

- Born: 5 October 1943; Schwichteler, Cappeln, Germany
- Died: 12 March 2019 (aged 75)
- Citizenship: German
- Education: Free University of Berlin; University of Hamburg
- Scientific career
- Fields: Egyptologist
- Workplaces: German Archaeological Institute; Free University Berlin; Berlin University

Günter Dreyer (5 October 1943 – 12 March 2019) was an Egyptologist at the German Archaeological Institute. In southern Egypt, Dreyer discovered records of linen and oil deliveries which have been carbon-dated to between 3300 BCE and 3200 BCE, predating the Dynastic Period.

== Academic career and findings ==
He originally worked as a chemical laboratory assistant. He studied Egyptology, Assyriology, and ancient Near Eastern Archeology at the University of Hamburg (1969-1971) and Free University of Berlin (1971-1978).

During his studies, he took part in excavations in Kamid al lawz in Lebanon, the Mortuary Temple of Seti I in Qurna, and on Elephantine.

In 1978 he received his doctorate with a thesis on temple dedications from the early period and the Old Kingdom (Der Tempel der Satet 1. Die Funde der Frühzeit und des Alten Reiches).

Between 1978 and 1987, Dreyer was a consultant in the Cairo department of the DAI and took part in excavations on Elephantine, in Wadi Garawi, and in Abydos . In 1987 he received a habilitation grant from the German Research Foundation and accepted a teaching position at the Free University of Berlin.

In 1988, Dreyer and his colleague Werner Kaiser excavated at the temple Umm el-Qa'ab in Abydos on the cemetery "U" the burial site of the king (U-j), which is dated to the Naquada period IIIa2, known as king Scorpion I. Currently, this is the earliest known large royal tomb of old Egypt. The most important finds were about 400 large wine jars being inscribed resp. having tags showing phonetically readable characters of a script, the first of its kind in Egypt. They identify the person laid into the grave, as the inscription says, "plantation of (king) Scorpion." Script also name his successor, a king Double Falcon I.

The scientific importance lies in the fact of finding Egyptian hieroglyphs which predate cuneiform script. The mentioned hieroglyphs are on small wooden tags applied to the jars, probably marking their origin and "are fully developed", as Dreyer stated.

In October 1989, he became the 2nd Director of the DAI, Cairo Department. He was responsible for the editing of the department's publication and also took over the management of the excavations in Abydos. In 1997 he published his habilitation thesis The Predynastic Royal Tomb Uj in Abydos, and his early written documents, and he became head of the excavations on Elephantine.

In November 1998, Dreyer became 1st director of the Cairo department of the DAI. In the same year, Dreyer found another writing on small ivory labels, and he concluded that these support the challenge to the prevailing view that the first people to write were the Sumerians of Mesopotamia (modern-day Iraq) sometime before 3000 BCE.

The academic also led excavations at the quarry cemetery in Giza (2002/03) and at the royal tombs of the 2nd dynasty in Saqqara (since 2002). He retired in 2008, and Stephan Seidlmayer was his successor. But he continued to work on his excavations and research in the following years. Dreyer died on March 12, 2019.

== Commemoration ==
On October 5, 2023 to commemorate the 80th year of his birth, the Thomas Heagy Foundation for the study of Early Egypt established the "Committee to Commemorate the life and achievements of Gunter Dreyer". The Committee consists of Thomas C Heagy (President of the Thomas Heagy Foundation), Isabel Plumed (Dreyer's widow), and Dietrich Raue (current Director of the German Institute of Archaeology in Cairo). At its inaugural meeting, the committee established as its first priority, the completion of the publication of cemetery Umm el Qaab which was left unfinished by Dreyer's untimely death.

== Books and Articles ==
- Der Tempel der Satet 1. Die Funde der Frühzeit und des Alten Reiches [The Temple of Satet 1: The finds from the Early Period and the Old Kingdom]. 1986.
- Umm el-Qaab 1. Das prädynastische Königsgrab U-j und seine frühen Schriftzeugnisse [Umm el-Qaab 1: The predynastic royal tomb U-j and its early written records]. Archäologische Veröffentlichungen, vol. 86. Mainz: Philipp von Zabern, 1998, ISBN 3-8053-2486-3.
- editor with Daniel Polz: Begegnung mit der Vergangenheit. 100 Jahre in Ägypten. Deutsches Archäologisches Institut Kairo 1907–2007 [Encounter with the past. 100 years in Egypt. German Archaeological Institute Cairo 1907-2007]. 2007.
- Günter Dreyer, Tomb U-j: A Royal Burial of Dynasty 0 at Abydos (pp.127-136) in Emily Teeter (editor) Before the Pyramids: The Origins of Egyptian Civilization The Oriental Institute of the Museum of Chicago 33, 2011 PDF

== See also ==
- Bull (Pharaoh)
