= Sekhemkhet =

Ancient Egyptian Pharaoh of 3rd dynasty

- Djosertety, Djoserty, Teti, Tyreis
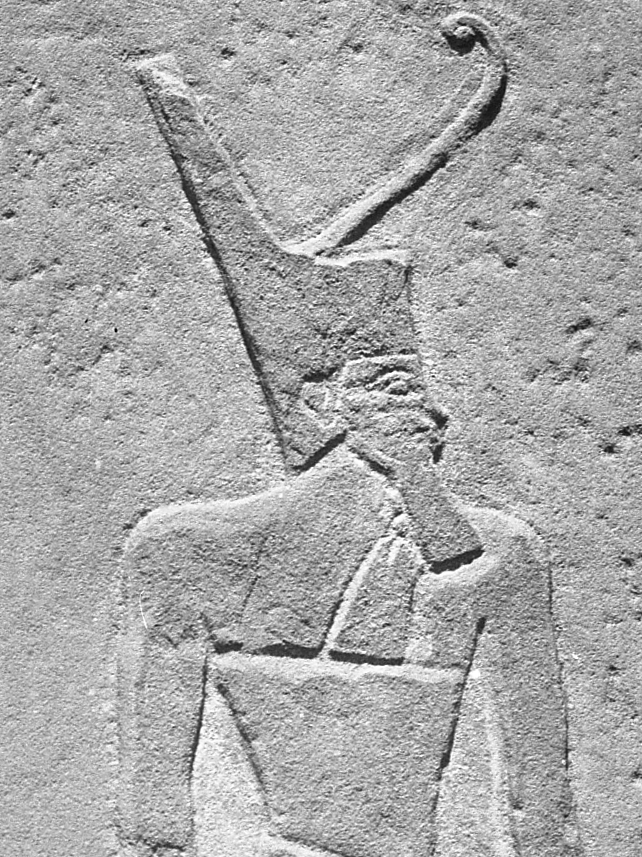
- Relief of Sekhemkhet from Wadi Maghareh, wearing the Deshret crown.

Pharaoh
- Reign: 6 or 7 regnal years c. 2650 BC
- Predecessor: Djoser
- Successor: Sanakht (most likely) or Khaba
Royal titulary
Horus name
Hor-Sekhemkhet
Ḥr-sẖm.ẖt
Powerful body of Horus
G5	S29 S42 F32
Nebty name
Nebty-Hetepren
Nb.tj-htp.rn
The two ladies are pleased with his name
G16 R4 D21 N35
Prenomen
Abydos King List
Teti
ttj
Of true greatness
< t t i >
Saqqara Tablet
Djoserteti
Ḏsr-ttj
The blessed one, of true greatness
< D45 t t M17 >
Turin King List
Djoserty
Ḏsr-tj
The blessed one is great
< D45 D21 X1 Z4 G7 > HASH
- Consort: Djeseretnebti ?
- Father: Khasekhemwy ?
- Mother: Nimaathap ?
- Burial: Buried Pyramid
- Dynasty: 3rd Dynasty

Sekhemkhet (also read as Sechemchet) was an ancient Egyptian king (pharaoh) of the 3rd Dynasty during the Old Kingdom. His reign is thought to have been from about 2648 BC until 2640 BC. He is also known under his later traditioned birth name Djoser-teti and under his Hellenized name Tyreis (by Manetho; derived from Teti in the Abydos King List). Sekhemkhet was probably the brother or eldest son of king Djoser. Little is known about this king, since he ruled for only a few years. However, he erected an unfinished step pyramid at Saqqara now known as the Buried Pyramid and left behind a well known rock inscription at Wadi Maghareh (Sinai Peninsula).

== Reign ==
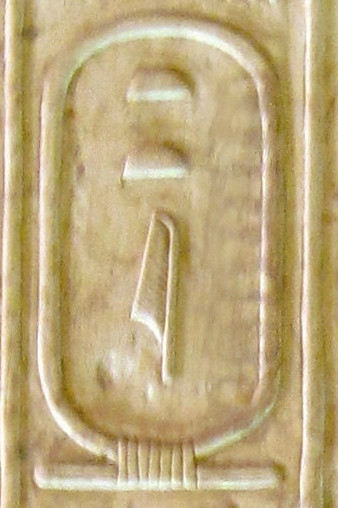
Cartouche name Teti from the Abydos king list.

The duration of Sekhemkhet's reign is believed to have been six to seven years. The royal Turin Canon attributes six years of reign to Sekhemkhet, a figure also proposed by Myriam Wissa based on the unfinished state of Sekhemkhet's pyramid. Using his reconstruction of the Palermo Stone (5th Dynasty), Toby Wilkinson assigns seven years to this king. This figure is based on the number of year registers preserved in Cairo Fragment I, register V. Wilkinson states that "this figure is fairly certain, since the [king's] titulary begins immediately after the dividing line marking the change of reign.". Similarly, the historian Manetho lists Sekhemkhet under the name of Tyreis and indicates that he reigned for seven years. Nabil Swelim, by contrast, proposed a reign of nineteen years, because he believed that Sekhemkhet might be the Tosertasis mentioned by Manetho. However, such a long reign is at odds with the unfinished state of the buried pyramid and this view is generally rejected by Egyptologists.

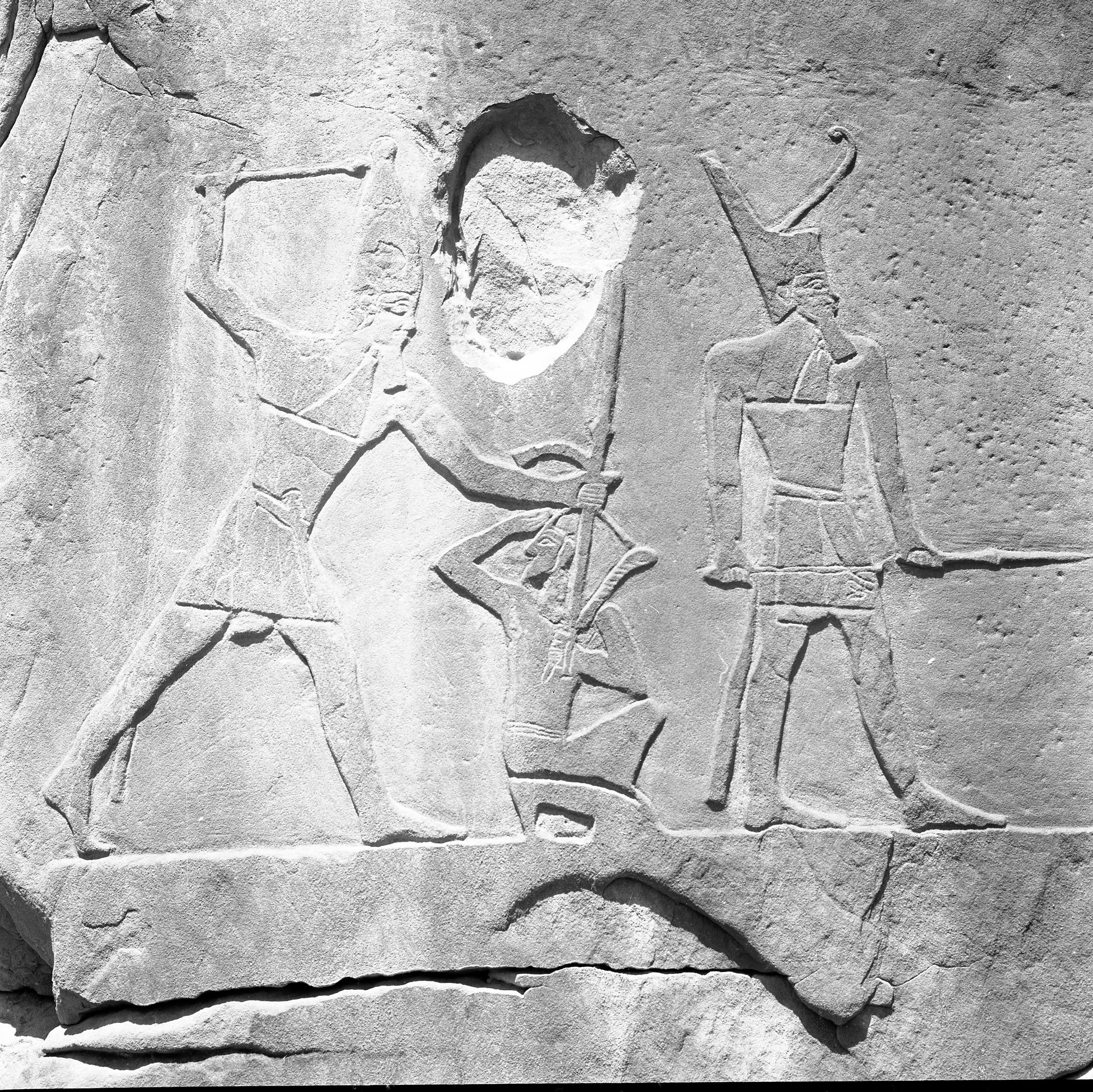
"Smiting the enemy" relief. Wadi Maghareh, Sinai peninsula. Sekhemkhet wearing the deshret crown on the right.

Little is known about activities conducted during Sekhemkhet's reign. The only preserved documents showing Sekhemkhet are two rock inscriptions at Wadi Maghareh in the Sinai Peninsula. The first one shows Sekhemkhet twice: once wearing the Hedjet crown, another wearing the Deshret crown. The second inscription depicts a scene known as "smiting the enemy": Sekhemkhet has grabbed a foe by its hair and raises his arm in an attempt to club the enemy to death with a ceremonial sceptre. The presence of these reliefs at Wadi Maghareh suggests that local mines of copper and turquoise were exploited during Sekhemkhet's reign. These mines were apparently active throughout the early 3rd Dynasty since reliefs of Djoser and Sanakht were also discovered in the Wadi Maghareh. One inscription from the Sinai states that Wepwawet "opens the way" to king Sekhemkhet's victory.

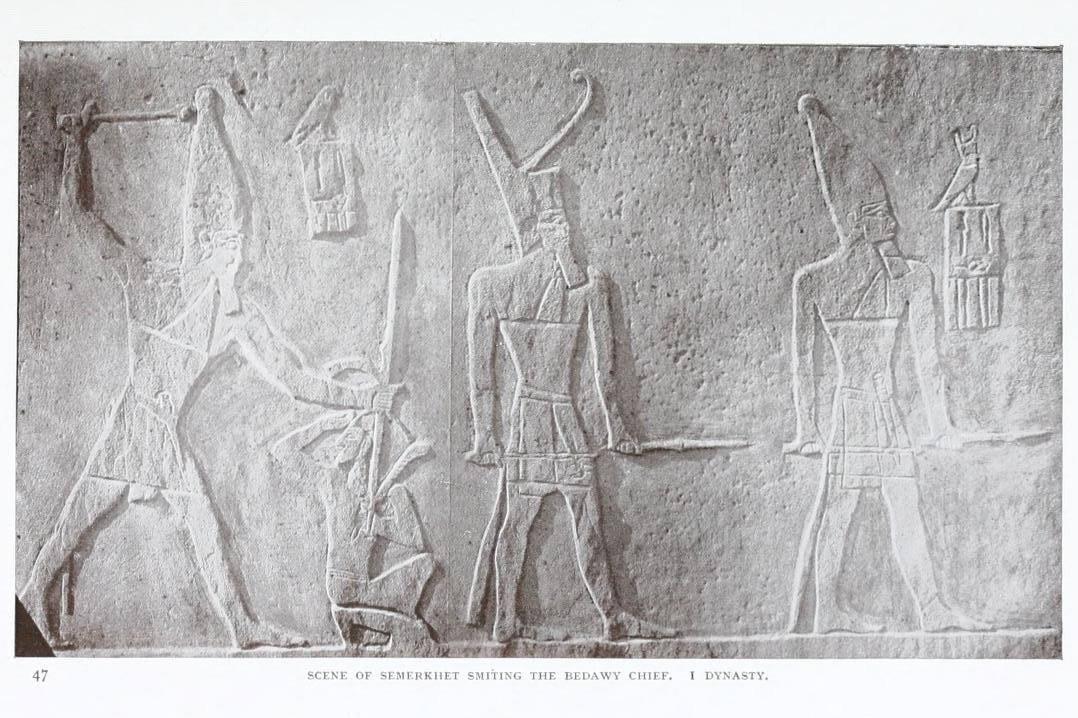
Archival photographs show the now-lost serekh of Sekhemkhet in situ before being removed, presumably looted during the first Israeli occupation of the Sinai Peninsula.

Several clay seals presenting an unusual Nebty name together with Sekhemkhet's Horus name were found at the eastern excavation site on the island of Elephantine. The Egyptologist Jean Pierre Pätznik reads the Nebty name as Ren nebty meaning The two ladies are pleased with his name. It is not entirely clear whether this is indeed Sekhemkhet's nebty name or that of a yet unknown queen.

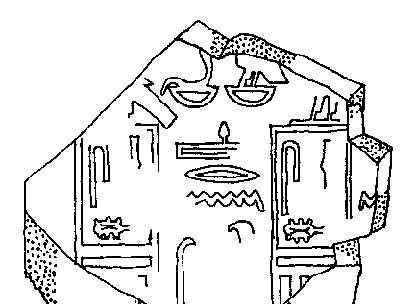
Clay seal from the island of Elephantine showing Sekhemkhet horus and nebty names.

== Family ==
Sekhemkhet's wife may have been Djeseretnebti, but this name appears without any queen's title, and Egyptologists dispute the true meaning and reading of this name. The name has alternatively been read as Djeser-Ti and identified with the cartouche-name Djeser-Teti presented in the Saqqara King List as the direct successor of Djoser. Sekhemkhet most likely had sons and daughters, but so far none have been attested.

Some consider Sekhemkhet to be the brother of Djoser, making him another son of Khasekhemwy, who was the final king of the Second Dynasty. If this is true, his mother would be Nimaathap.

== Tomb ==
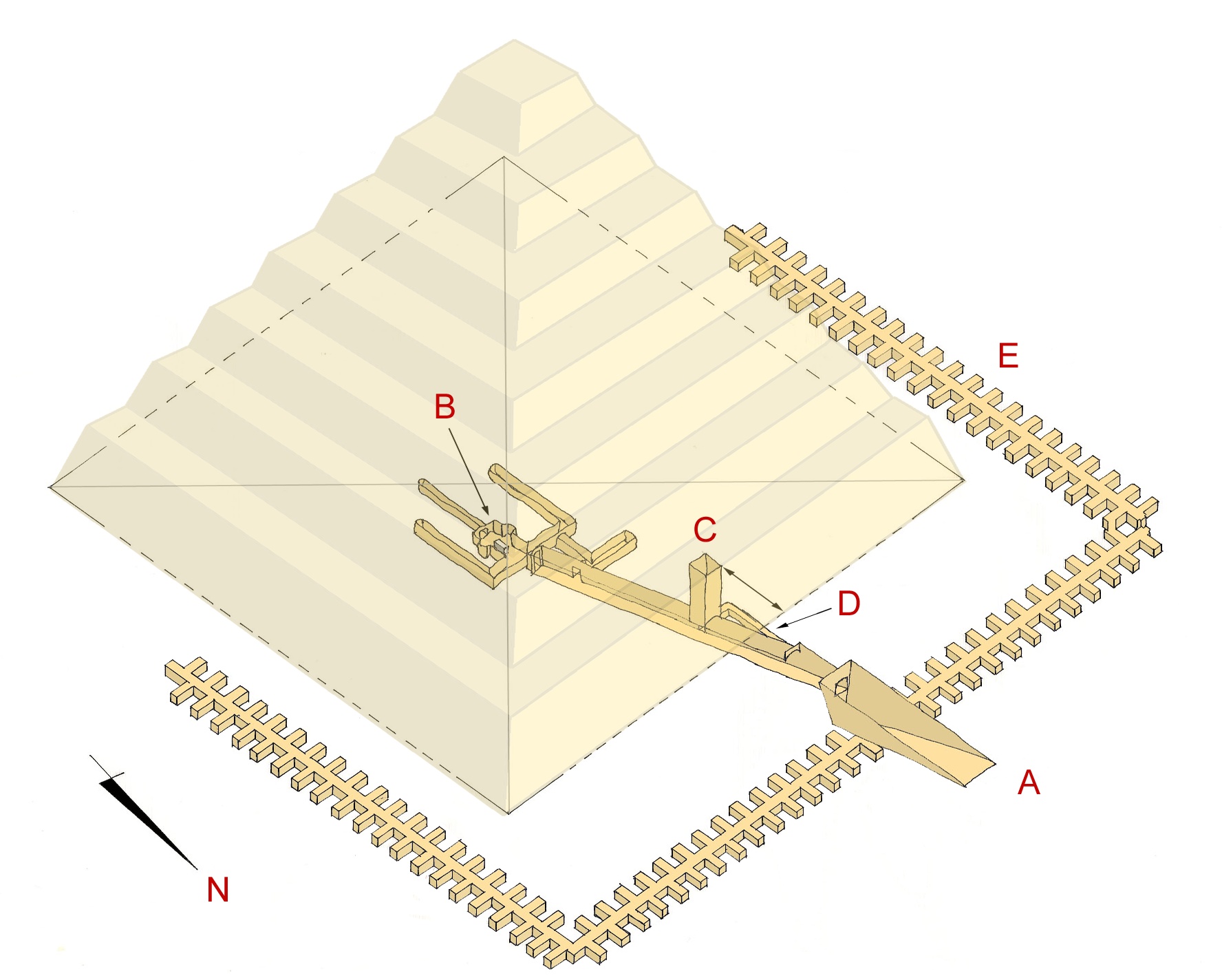
Schematical depiction of Sekhemkhet's step pyramid

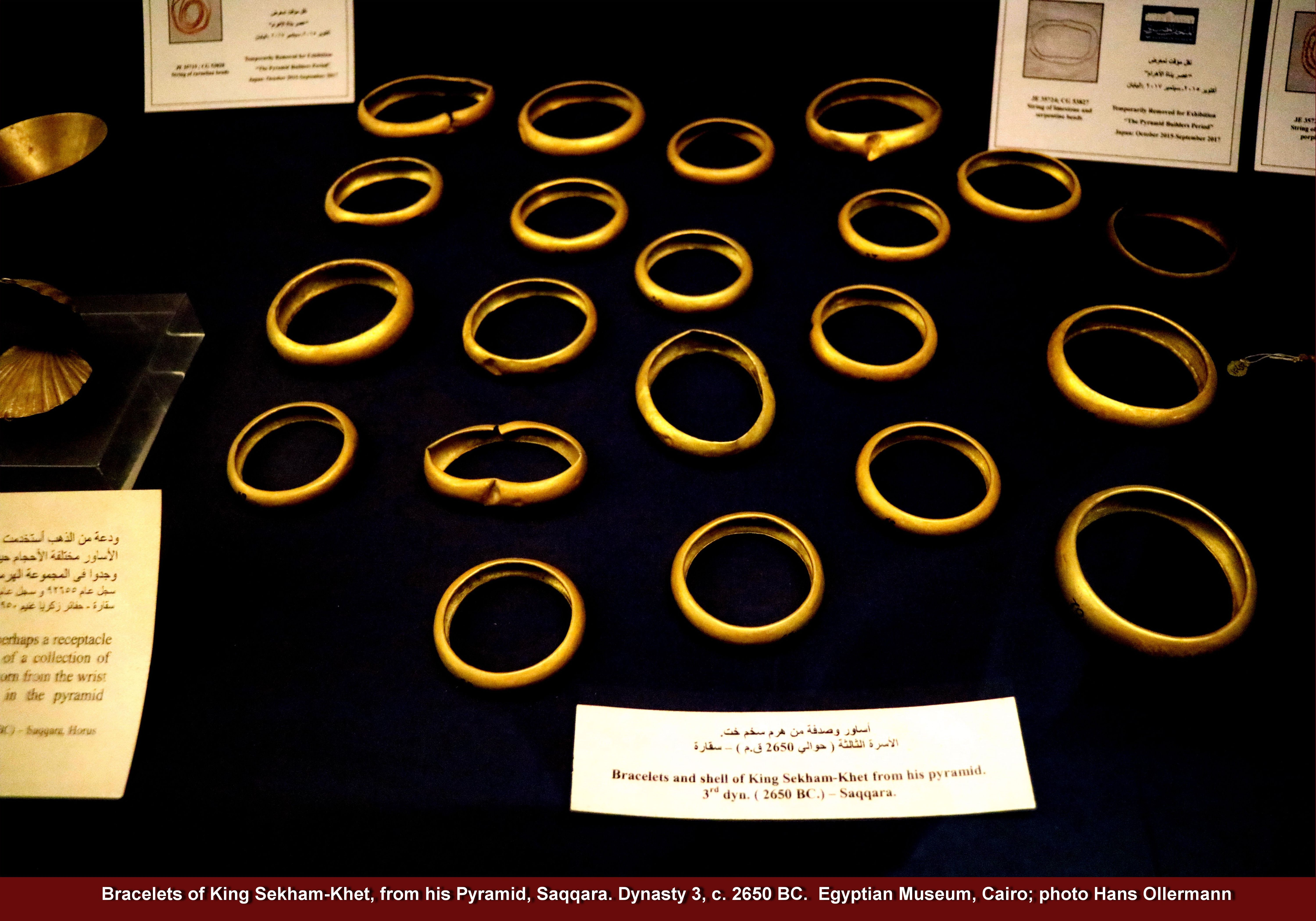
A hoard of 21 gold bracellets and a shell shaped container found in Sekhemkhet's pyramid tomb on display at the Egyptian Museum.

Sekhemkhet's pyramid is sometimes referred to as the "Buried Pyramid" and was first excavated in 1952 by Egyptian archaeologist Zakaria Goneim. A sealed sarcophagus was discovered beneath the pyramid, but when opened was found to be empty.

=== Pyramid ===
Sekhemkhet's pyramid was planned as a step pyramid. Its base was a square measuring 378 ft x 378 ft (220 x 220 cubits). If the pyramid had been completed, it would have had six or seven steps and a final height of 240.5 ft (140 cubits). These proportions would have given the pyramid an angle of elevation of 51˚50', identical to the pyramid at Meidum and the Great Pyramid of Giza. Like Djoser's pyramid, Sekhemkhet's was built of limestone blocks. The monument was not finished, possibly because of the pharaoh's sudden death. Only the first step of the pyramid was completed, leaving a monument in the shape of a large square mastaba.

=== Subterranean structure ===
The entrance to Sekhemkhet's burial lies on the northern side of the pyramid. An open passage leads down for 200 ft. Halfway down the track a vertical shaft meets the passage from above. It opens on the surface and its entrance would lie at the second step of the pyramid, if the monument had been completed.

At the meeting spot of the passage and shaft another passageway leads down to a subterranean, U-shaped gallery containing at least 120 magazines. The whole gallery complex has the appearance of a giant comb. Shortly before the burial chamber is reached the main passage splits into two further magazine galleries, surrounding the burial chamber like a "U" (similar to the big northern gallery), but they were never finished.

The burial chamber has a base measurement of 29 ft x 17 ft and a height of 15 ft. It was also left unfinished, but surprisingly a nearly completely arranged burial was found. The sarcophagus in the midst of the chamber is made of polished alabaster and shows an unusual feature: its opening lies on the front side and is sealed by a sliding door, which was still plastered with mortar when the sarcophagus was found. The sarcophagus was empty, however and it remains unclear whether the site was ransacked after burial or whether King Sekhemkhet was buried elsewhere.

A shell shaped container made of gold was found by an Egyptian Antiquities Service excavation team in 1950. The object has a length of 1.4 in and is currently on display in Room 4 of the Egyptian Museum in Cairo. A small trove of 21 gold bracelets in Sekhemkhet's tomb was also found in this king's tomb. The bracelets and shell shaped container likely escaped detection by ancient Egyptian tomb robbers who would have looted Sekhemkhet's tomb and the king's sarcophagus in ancient times.

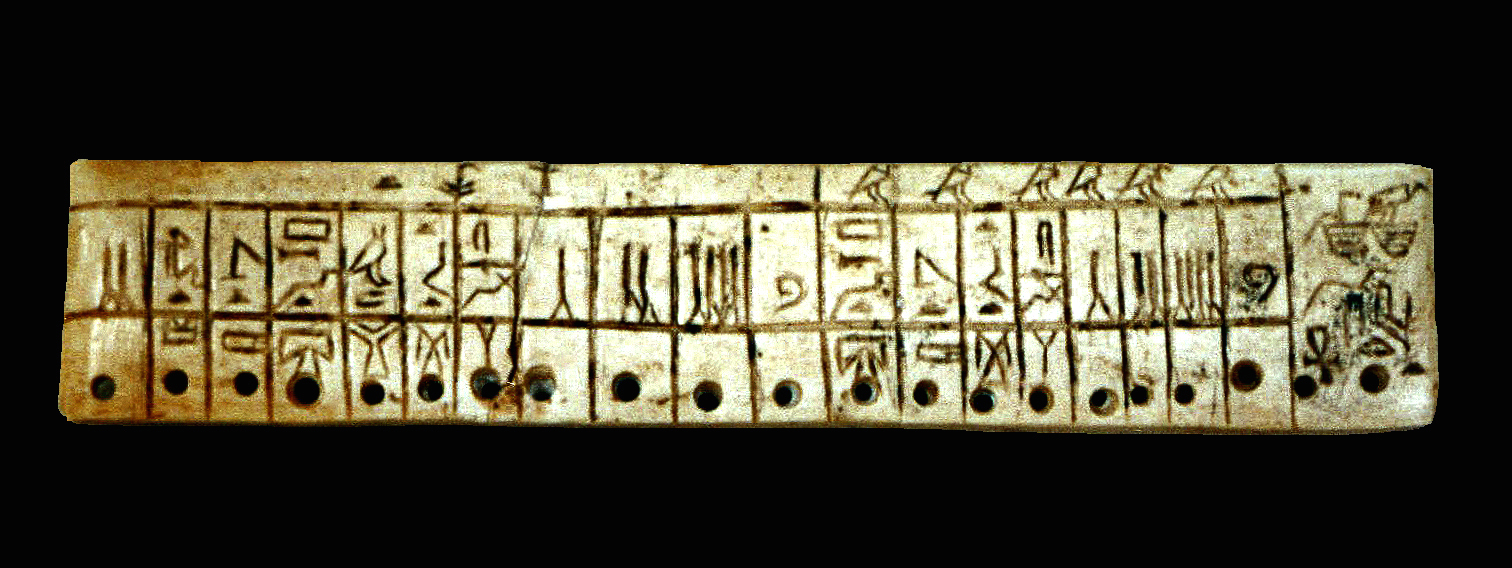
An ivory plaque bearing the form of Sekhemkhet's Nebty name of "Djoserty" found in the remains of his step pyramid tomb.

=== Necropolis complex ===
Because the necropolis of Sekhemkhet was never finished, it is hard to say which planned cultic building had already existed. The pyramid courtyard was surrounded by a niched enclosure wall facing north-west. It was 1.850 ft long, 607 ft wide and 33 ft high. The only archaeologically preserved cultic building is the Southern Tomb, its base measurement is estimated to be 105 ft x 52 ft. The subterranean structure included a tight corridor, beginning on the western side of the tomb and ending in a double chamber. In this chamber in 1963 Jean-Philippe Lauer excavated the burial of a two-year-old toddler. The identity of this child remains a mystery. The only fact known for certain about it is that it cannot be king Sekhemkhet himself, since the king was always depicted as a young man.

No further cultic buildings were detected, but Egyptologists and archaeologists are convinced that once upon a time a mortuary temple and a serdab existed but were destroyed due to the looting of stone from his cult buildings in antiquity.

== See also ==
- List of Egyptian pyramids
- List of megalithic sites

== Bibliography ==
- Hawass, Zahi. "Excavating the Old Kingdom". in Egyptian Art in the Age of the Pyramids, The Metropolitan Museum of Art. 1999.
- Leclant, Jean. "A Brief History of the Old Kingdom". in Egyptian Art in the Age of the Pyramids, The Metropolitan Museum of Art. 1999.
- Wilkinson, Toby. Royal Annals of Ancient Egypt: The Palermo Stone and Its Associated Fragments, Kegan Paul International, 2000.
