= Nebty name =

One of the 'Great five names' used by Egyptian pharaohs

Nebty name in hieroglyphs
Full title
G16
nebty
He of Nekhbet and Wadjet (He of the Two Ladies)
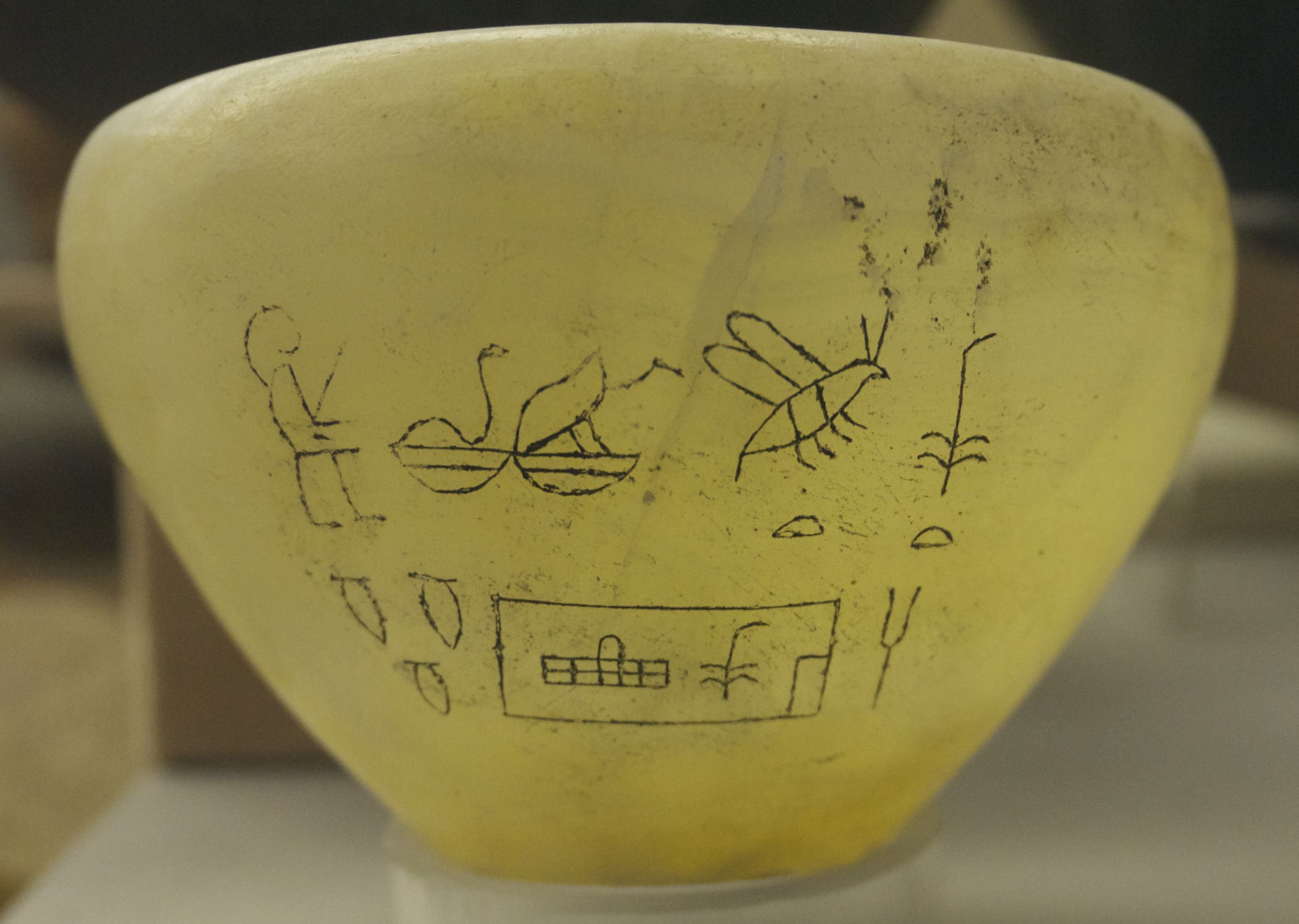
- Nebty name of king Semerkhet

The Nebty name (also called the Two-Ladies-name) was one of the "great five names" used by Egyptian pharaohs. It was also one of the oldest royal titles. The modern term "Two-Ladies-name" is a simple derivation from the translation of the Egyptian word nebty.

== Etymology ==
The terms "Nebty name" and "Two-Ladies-name" derive from the Egyptian word nbtj (Nebty), which is a dual noun meaning "the (two) ladies". As a mere noun it is a religious euphemism designating the goddesses Nekhbet and Wadjet as a deified pair. As a royal crest it was thought to represent a unified Egypt.

== Heraldic appearance ==
The Nebty name, similarly to the later Niswt-Bity name, was constructed with two sign groups. The first one shows a griffon vulture sitting on a basket. The second group shows an erect cobra, also sitting on a basket. The oldest versions of the Nebty name showed instead of the cobra the red crown above the second basket. The sign groups forming the Nebty name were never used separately.

== Symbolism ==
The Nebty name was symbolically linked to the two most important goddesses of Ancient Egyptian kingship: Nekhbet and Wadjet. Whilst Nekhbet (Egypt. Nekhebety; "she from Nekheb") was the "mistress of Upper Egypt", her counterpart Wadjet (Egypt. Wadyt; "she who thrives" or simply "lady of the green") was the "mistress of Lower Egypt". Nekhbet was worshipped as the "celestial mother of a king", which is expressed in the Ancient Egyptian queen title Mwt-niswt ("mother of the king"). The cobra of Wadjet was worshipped as the "celestial diadem snake on the king's forehead", believed to spit fire at anyone who dared to take on the pharaoh. This protective behaviour made Wadjet very popular and already in early dynastic times several deities were depicted as wearing a uraeus on their foreheads. With his Nebty name each pharaoh wished to present himself as the one under the guidance and protection of the two goddesses, thus legitimizing himself as being ruler of the whole of Egypt.

== Introduction and history ==
Naqada Label, showing the Horus name of the pharaoh Aha with what appears to be an enclosure featuring the name "Menes" beneath the Nebty symbol. Drawing by John Garstang

After the Horus name, the Nebty name is the second oldest royal name of Ancient Egyptian history and also known as the "Two-Ladies name". Egyptologists such as Toby Wilkinson and Ludwig David Morenz point to an obvious prototype of the Nebty name used before the introduction of the final form: ivory tags from the Abydos tombs of the kings Hor-Aha and Djer and the queen Neithhotep show the Two-Ladies crest with the red crown instead of the cobra over a basket. In the case of Hor-Aha the Nebty crest is of special interest, because it is depicted inside a three-framed building (shrine? tomb?) together with the hieroglyph Men (Gardiner sign Y5; meaning "to stay" or "to endure"). It is intensely disputed whether this sign group merely gives the name of a Nebty shrine (Men-Nebty; "where the Two Ladies endure"), whether it shows Aha's Nebty name inside his tomb or whether it shows, instead, Narmer's Nebty name, indicating that Aha buried Narmer. The ivory tags of kings Djer and Djet show the prototype inside a palace and a shrine, guided by the notation that the kings visited the palace of the Two Ladies or oversaw the building of wine cellars for the Nebty shrine. The first use of the final form of the Nebty crest (vulture and cobra over two baskets) appeared during the reign of king Semerkhet, who called himself Iry-Nebty ("guardian of the Two Ladies"). After him, every future king used a Nebty name, though not every king of the early dynasties and the Old Kingdom is known by his Nebty name.

A further problem in determining Nebty names is a fashion which arose during the reign of king Peribsen. He was the first ruler who used the Nebty crest as a separate name or title. After him, it seems that other rulers used separate Nebty names, too. Evidence for that is the case of king Qa'a. Ivory tag inscriptions reveal that Qa'a obviously used two different Nebty names: Qa'a-Nebty ("raised arm of the Two Ladies") and Sen-Nebty ("kissed by the Two Ladies" or "brother of the Two Ladies"). And king Hotepsekhemwy called himself Sehotep-Nebty ("the Two Ladies are pleased (with him)"), thus using virtually the same name as he used for his serekh name. Another problem in assigning Nebty names is that during the Old Kingdom Egyptian queens also used the Nebty crest as a part of their birth names. Prominent examples are the queens Hetephernebti and Djefatnebti. This has caused a problem concerning the interpretation of a Nebty name appearing on an ivory stencil from Saqqara. It is disputed whether it was the name of a queen (Djeseret-ankh-Nebty) or just the Nebty name of king Sekhemkhet.

== See also ==
- Horus name
- Two Ladies
