= Beit Khallaf =

Village in Upper Egypt

- Location in Egypt
- Coordinates: 26°19′N 31°47′E
- Country: Egypt
- Governorate: Sohag
- Time zone: UTC+2 (EET)
  - Summer (DST): UTC+3 (EEST)

Beit Khallaf (Arabic: بيت خلاف; [ˈbeːt xalˈlaːf]) is a small rural village located 10 kilometers west of Girga in Upper Egypt. Beit Khallaf is part of the area known as the Hajer line, which is composed of three other villages: Beit Allam, Beit Khuraybi, and Beit Dawud Sahl. In 2006, the population of the village was 10,895. The area has several mastabas and burial sites and is governed by the Egyptian ministry of Antiques as an Ancient archaeological site.

== Overview ==
During the 1900–1901 excavation season in Egypt, John Garstang examined sites north of Abydos for the Egyptian Research Account, covering the land between the villages of Alawniyeh and Bet Khallaf (Bayt Khallāf), including the modern settlements of El Mahasna (Al Maḩāsinah); Bet Allam; Maslahet Harum; Bet; and Ilg. The expedition camp was based near the walled village of Maslahet-Harun, south of El Mahasna. Between the villages of Alawniyeh and Bet Allam they discovered traces of a prehistoric cemetery (site L) which had been almost completely plundered. Between Maslahet Harum and El Mahasna they excavated the site of a prehistoric settlement (site M S) and a necropolis dating from the 4th–11th Dynasty (site M). They also examined a nearby site (site N) containing burials dating from the same period.

At the end of January 1901, it was decided to investigate large brick structures standing in the desert near the village of Bet Khallaf (site K), which Garstang discovered to be the site several mastaba tombs dating from the 3rd Dynasty. Based upon a seal impression discovered in tomb K1 inscribed with the name of king Neter-khet (Netjerkhet or Djoser), Garstang believed the tomb was the burial place of the king (although he is widely thought to have been buried in the step pyramid in the Saqqara necropolis, Egypt). Another inscription discovered in tomb K2 led Garstang to the assumption that it was the tomb of Hen-nekht (Sa-nekht), thought to be the predecessor of Nejterkhet. Garstang also discovered smaller tombs at the site which he believed to be the tombs of servants of Netjerkhet.

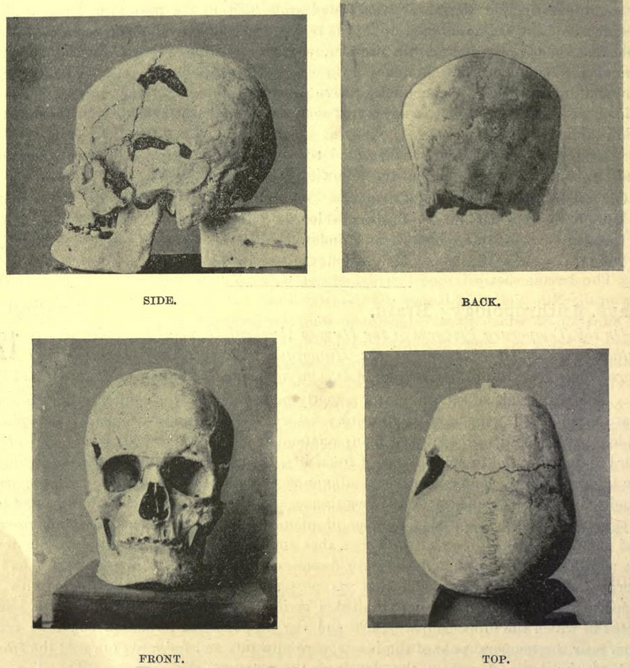
Possible skull of Pharaoh Sanakht (Hen Nekht) from mastaba K2 at Beit Khallaf

The largest tomb, K1, rises 8 metres above the desert and covers an area of over 3800 square meters. It was surrounded by a two metre thick outer wall, with brickwork around the pits and corners. The burial shaft lies 25 metres below the surface at the bottom of a stairway which was blocked by six massive stones. The ceiling above the stairway was constructed of descending barrel vaults supported by mud brick arches and are thought to be the oldest known vaults in Egypt. Nearly 800 cylindrical alabaster vases were removed from the stairway, including some with mud caps sealed with the name of 'Neter-Khet' (Netjerikhet). The burial chamber comprised 18 chambers leading out from a central passage. Grave robbers had dug a small hole underneath the mastaba scattering bones and offering vessels. The second largest tomb, K2, was of a similar design to K1, contained human remains and a small fragment inscribed with the name of 'Hen-nekht' or 'sa-nekht' (Sanakht).

== Primary sources ==
The Garstang Museum of Archaeology, University of Liverpool hold photographic materials from John Garstang's excavation at Beit Khallaf. The catalogue is available online on the Archives Hub website.
