= El Mahasna =

Village in Upper Egypt

- Location in Egypt
- Coordinates: 26°16.5′N 31°49.75′E
- Country: Egypt
- Governorate: Sohag
- Time zone: UTC+2 (EET)
  - Summer (DST): UTC+3 (EEST)

El Mahasna (Al Maḩāsinah) is a modern settlement and archaeological site near Beit Khallaf and north of Abidos.

El Mahasna is famous for various artifact of the Naqada I period and later, particularly a statuette of a man with penile sheath, equivalents of which exist, such as the Ashmolean Museum Mac Gregor Man statuette, or the golden statuettes from Tell el-Farkha.

The site was excavated in the early 20th century, resulting in an influential report: Pre-dynastic cemetery at El Mahasna.

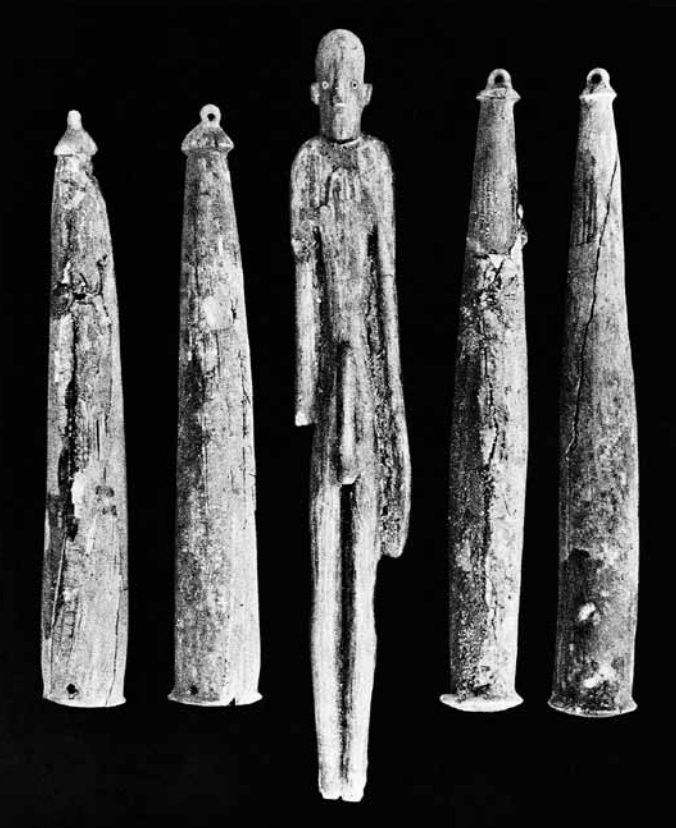
Man with penile sheath and four pendants. Tomb H29, El Mahasna. Naqada I Pre-Dynastic period.

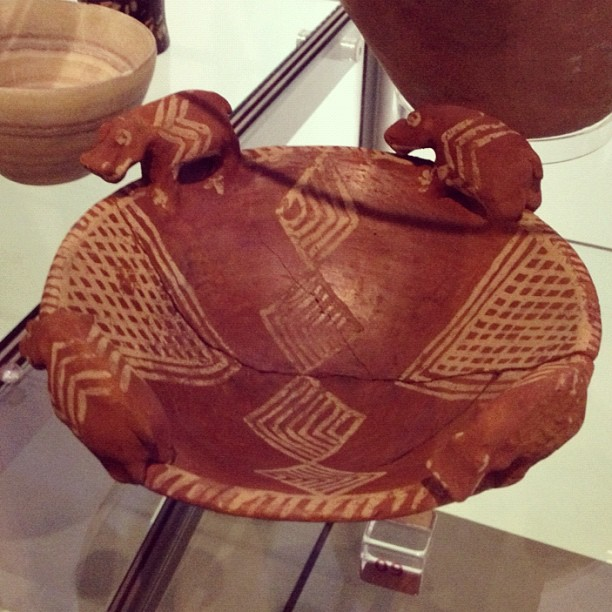
Bowl with hippopotamus, El Mahasna

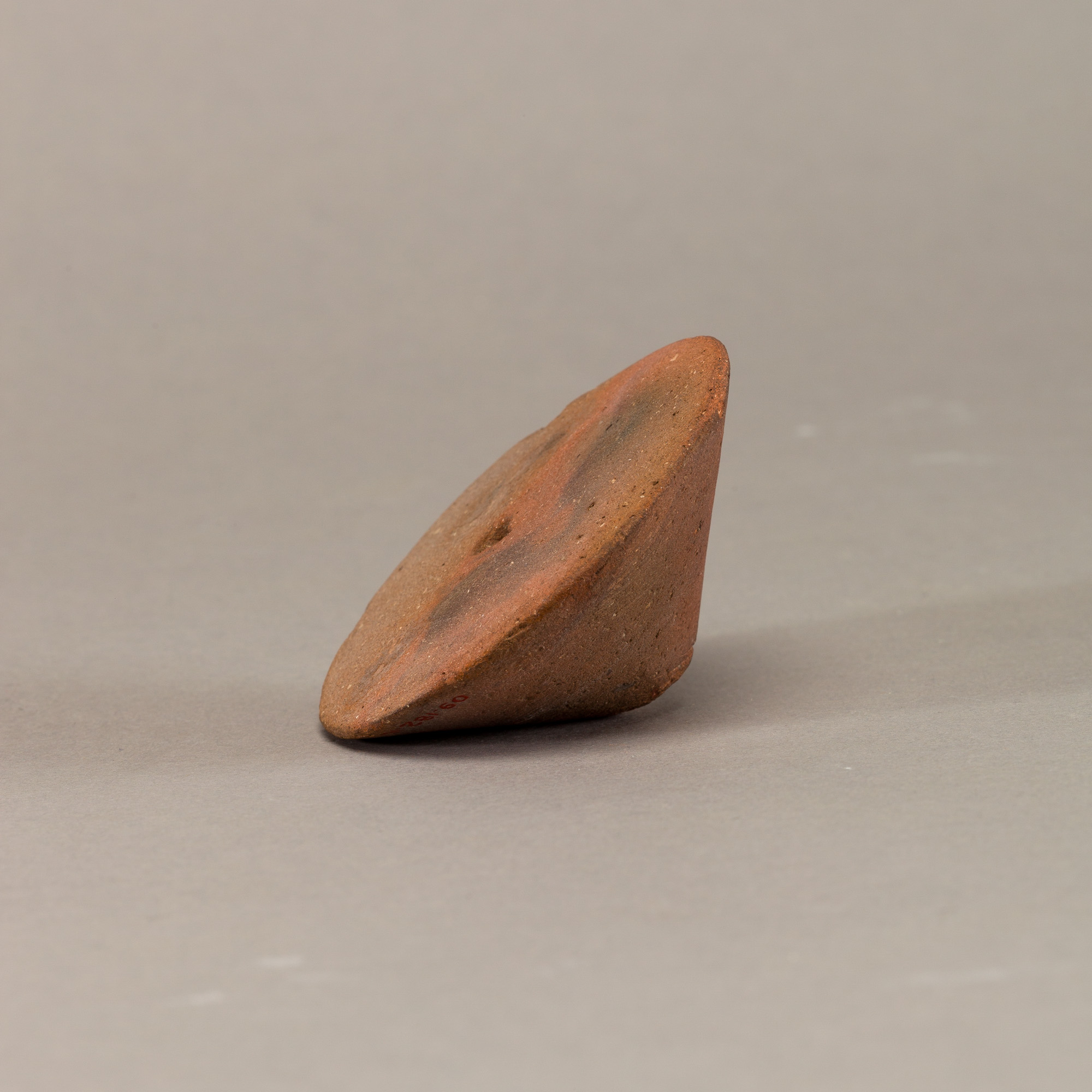
Discoidal macehead, El Mahasna

== Sources ==
- Ayrton, Edward R. (Edward Russell) (1911). Pre-dynastic cemetery at El Mahasna. London; Boston, Mass., U.S.A. : Sold at the Offices of the Egypt Exploration Fund.
