= Buried Pyramid =

Step Pyramid of Sekhemkhet

Step Pyramid of Sekhemkhet (Buried Pyramid)
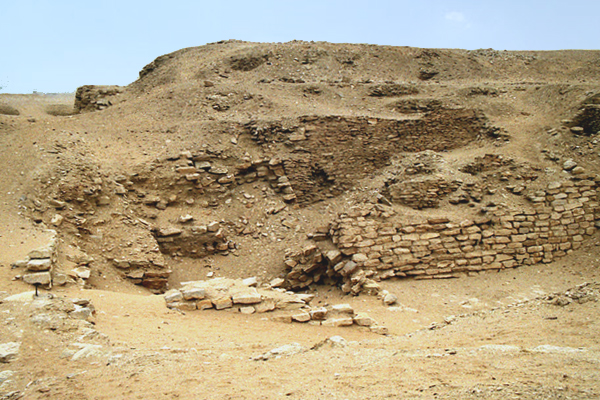
- The unfinished pyramid in 2001
- Interactive map of Step Pyramid of Sekhemkhet (Buried Pyramid)
- 29.866°N 31.213°E
- Owner: Sekhemkhet, 3rd Dynasty
- Constructed: c. 2645 BC
- Type: Unfinished step pyramid
- Material: Limestone
- Height: Planned 70 metres (230 ft); Reached 8 metres (26 ft)
- Base: 115 metres (377 ft)
- Slope: 50°36' (estimated)

The Step Pyramid of Sekhemkhet (Buried Pyramid) is an unfinished seven-step pyramid constructed c. 2645 BC for Sekhemkhet. He was the second king of the Third Dynasty of Ancient Egypt, which reigned over Egypt c. 2686–2613 BC and is usually placed at the beginning of the Old Kingdom of Egypt. Many historians believe that the third dynasty played an important role in the transition from Early Dynastic Period of Egypt to the Age of the Pyramids.

Sekhemkhet Djoserty was also the successor to the better-known pharaoh Netjerikhet Djoser, who was buried in his famous step pyramid at Saqqara. The buried pyramid was originally modelled after Djoser's step pyramid and is located several hundred metres southwest. It is also arguable that the pyramid of Sekhemkhet was originally designed to surpass the step pyramid of Djoser but barely made it above ground level and hence was given the name the Buried Pyramid. Its incompletion is thought to have been due to Sekhemkhet's short reign as ruler, which was approximately six years.

== History ==
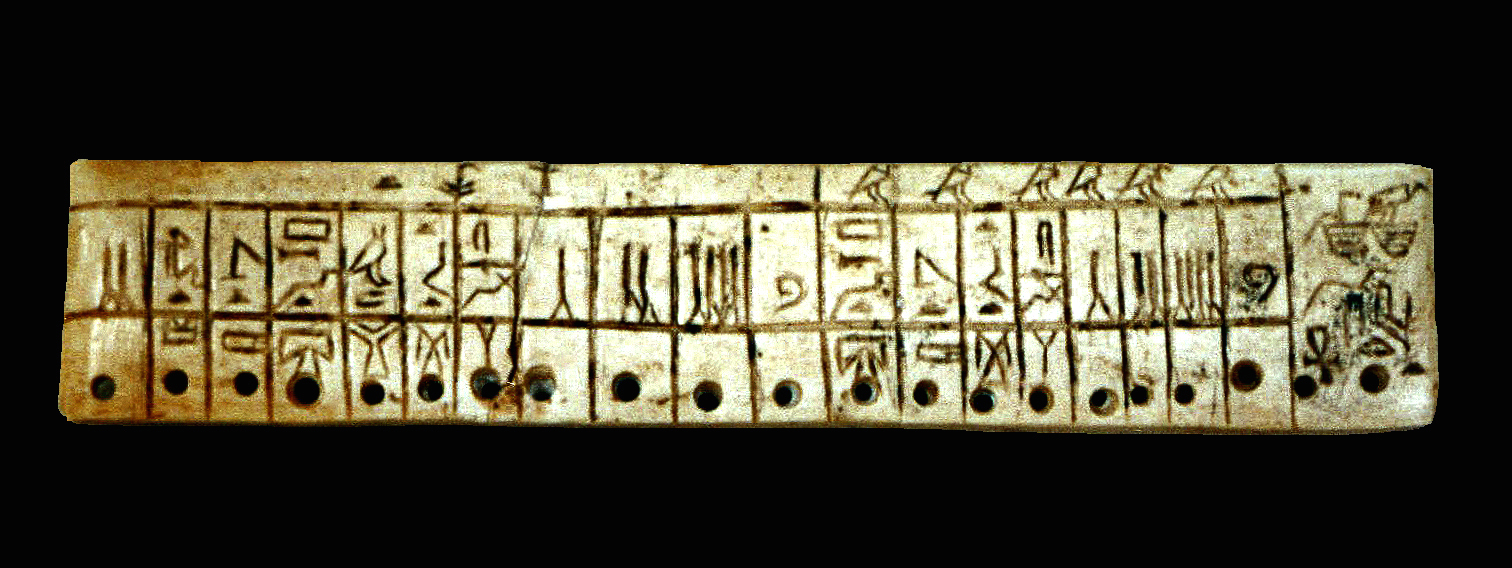
Ivory plaque found in 1955 by Z. Goneim on the floor of the main hall of the pyramid and bearing the Nebty name Djoserty and a list of linen fabrics

The Buried Pyramid was a previously unknown structure until, in 1951, Egyptologist Zakaria Goneim noticed the odd rectangular shape in the desert while excavating the nearby Unas complex. A three part rubble-coursed enclosure wall was first discovered, and by digging to its bottom, it was found to be 5.2 m (17 ft) tall and 18 m (60 ft) thick. He later discovered that the wall further extended on both sides to dimensions of 520 m (1,700 ft) in the north–south axis and 180 m (600 ft) to the east–west and was full of false doors and niches.

The pyramid itself was located at the centre of the complex, with a base length of 115 m (377 ft), it had only one step and was unfinished. As a result, Goneim initially thought that it was a mastaba. During the next stage of excavation, Goneim discovered a descending passage to the north side which led to a gallery blocked with rubble and masonry, convincing him that it was actually a pyramid. Objects found during the excavation of this gallery included animal bones, demotic papyri, and Third Dynasty stone vessels. In a decayed wooden casket, gold was discovered which included gold bracelets, cosmetic cases, beads, and jars inscribed with Sekhemkhet's name.

When the blocked wall was breached, on May 31, 1954, an unfinished and undecorated burial chamber was discovered. Inside it, lay an alabaster sarcophagus cut from a single block with a vertical lid which seemed to still be sealed. On June 26, 1954, after great difficulties to unblock and raise the lid, the sarcophagus was opened and was found to be empty.

Harsh criticism of Goneim which wrongfully spread the rumor that he had supposedly helped in the smuggling of an ancient artifact out of Egypt and his subsequent suicide (or murder) on January 12, 1959, dampened the interest in the pyramid and its investigation was left incomplete.

In 1963, the excavation was re-opened by Jean-Philippe Lauer due to the possibility of a south tomb and his desire to find the missing mummy. Lauer found a partially destroyed tomb under the southern side that had been looted by robbers. He found a wooden coffin with the remains of an unidentified two-year-old child and gold leaf fragments.

== The complex ==
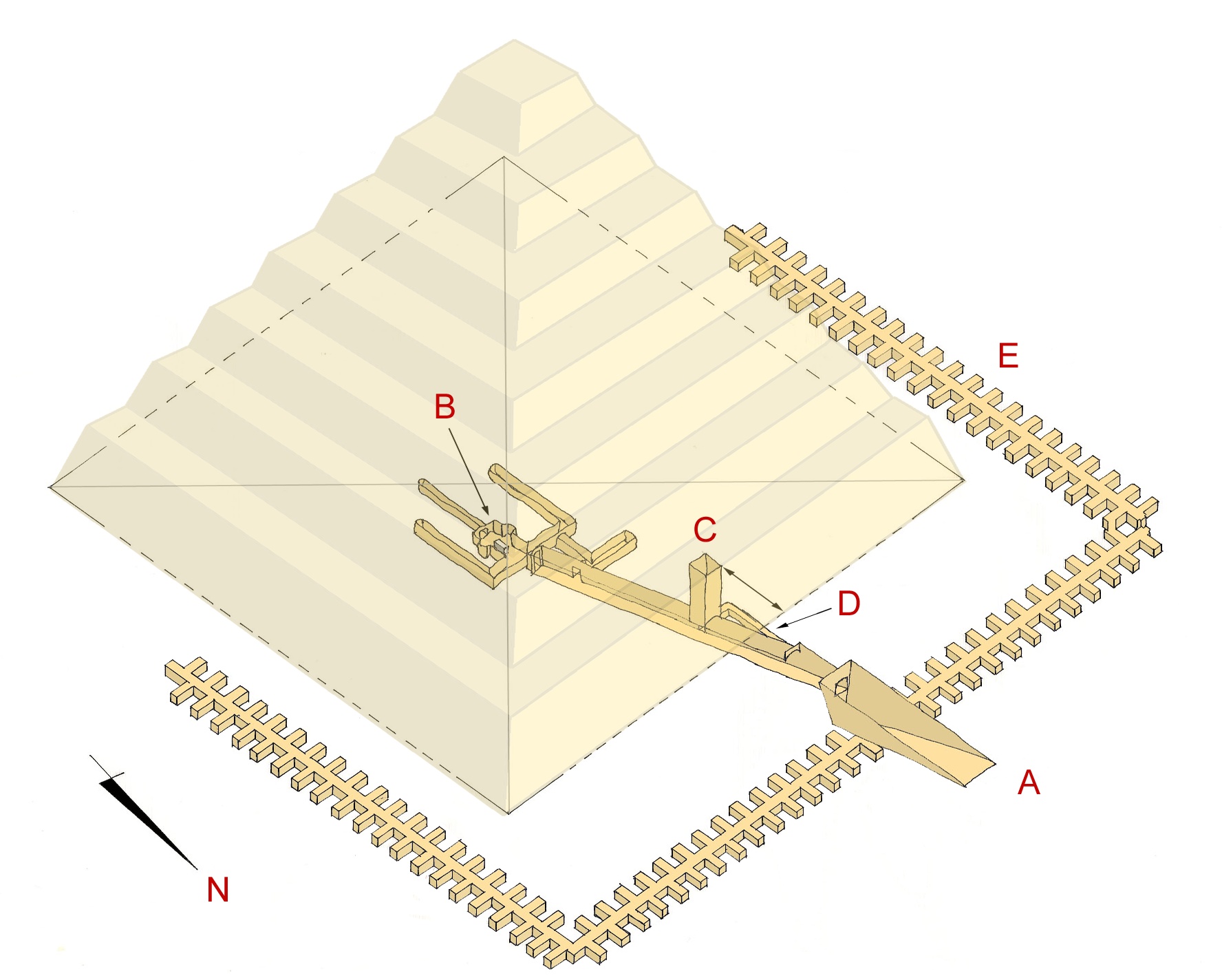
Schematical depiction of Sekhemkhet's step pyramid. A is the entrance. E is the comb-shaped magazine gallery.

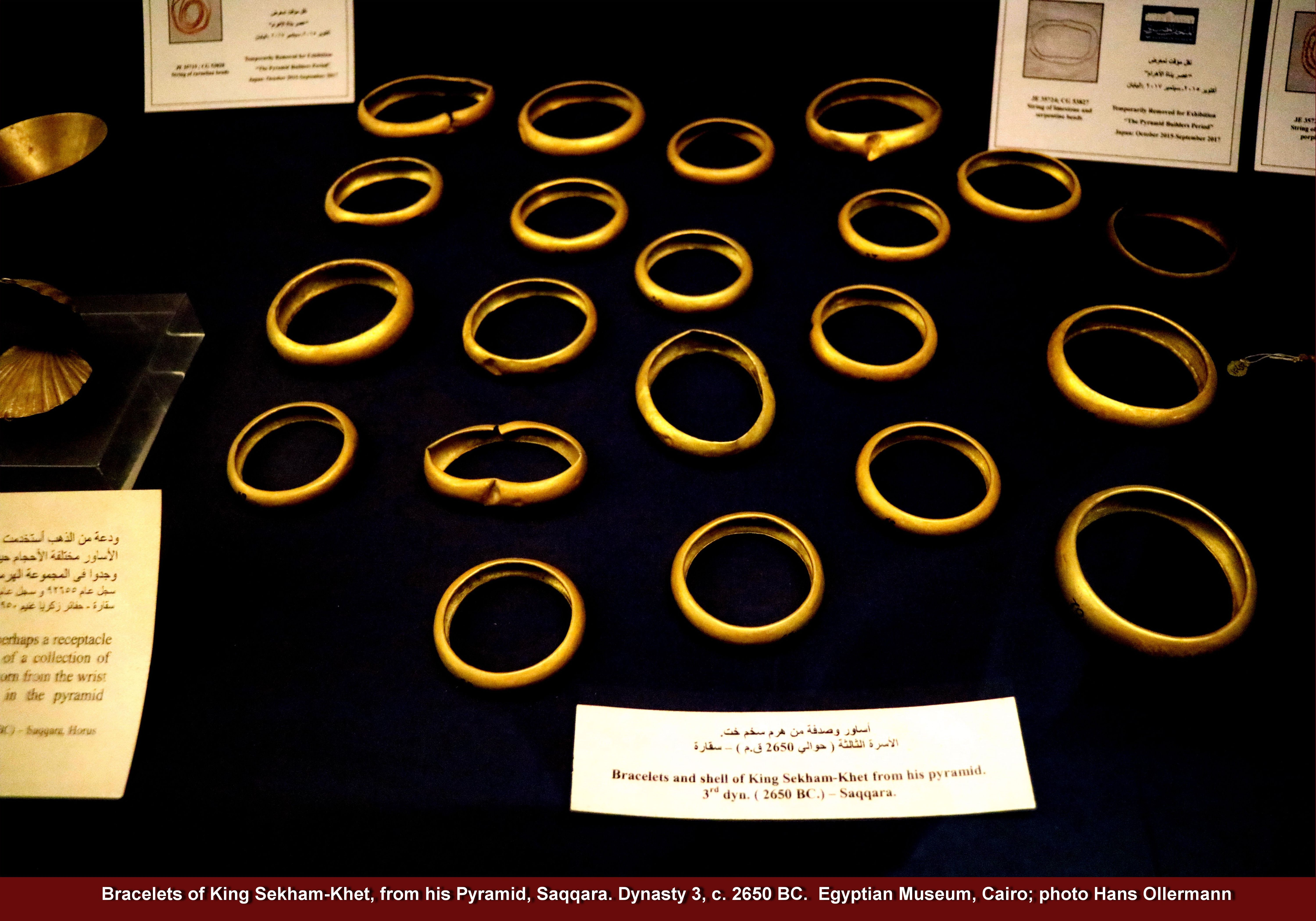
A hoard of 21 gold bracellets and a shell shaped container found in Sekhemkhet's pyramid tomb on display at the Egyptian Museum

Sekhemkhet's pyramid complex was built southwest of Djoser's at Saqqara, and it includes a pyramid, a subterranean structure, and a necropolis complex.

The name Imhotep appears on a section of the complex's enclosure wall. While the name itself contains no titles and thus it is uncertain if this is the same architect that planned Djoser's Step Pyramid, the line of succession and similar architectural features suggest such a possibility.

=== Pyramid ===
The ancient name of Sekhemkhet's pyramid is unknown; however, it is colloquially known as Buried Pyramid due to its unfinished nature as well as it being previously unknown until its discovery in 1951, when it was found beneath the sands. Its present state is more similar to a mastaba, only reaching 8 metres (26 ft) of height. The pyramid's foundations stand upon an uneven rock surface, leading the builders to try to level the terrain by building terraces, some reaching ten metres high.

With a base 115 metres (377 ft) in length, it suggests that, if it had been completed, the superstructure would be taller than its neighbour, with seven steps and rising to 70 metres (230 ft).

As the pyramid was unfinished, it never received its limestone casing, but the construction technique can be still be made out: the limestone blocks are inclined inwards by 15°, with sloping courses of stone laid at right angles to the incline.

=== Substructure ===
The entrance to the subterranean structure lies to the north, starting with a narrow passage that descends for about 61 m (200 ft) until meeting a vertical shaft from the top of the corridor. At this spot, another passage leads down to a gallery of 136 unfinished magazine chambers which forms a U shape around the pyramid. Two further such magazine galleries appear right before the entrance to the burial chamber with a similar disposition, and like their counterparts, they were never finished.

The burial chamber has a base measurement of 8.8 m × 5.18 m (28.9 ft × 17.0 ft) and a height of 4.5 m (15 ft). It was also left unfinished, yet it contained a complete burial arrangement. The sarcophagus is cut from a single block of fine alabaster. The lid was vertical, and slid into place and held at the front face by means of mortar sealing.

=== Necropolis complex ===
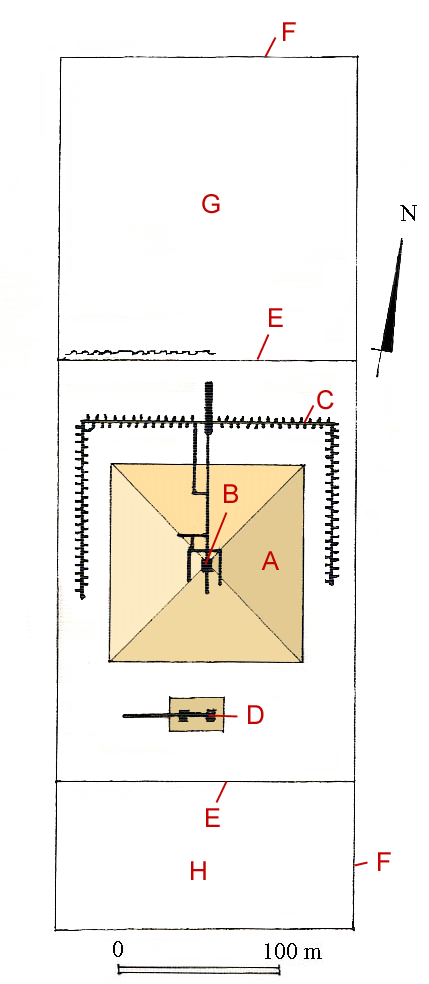
Plan of the pyramid complex A: Pyramid B: Burial chamber C: Magazine gallery D: South tomb E: Wall (pre-extension) F: Wall (post-extension) G: North extension H: South extension

The complex is oriented with a north–south axis, but with an accuracy deviation of about 11°. One notable feature of this complex is an inner wall known as "White Wall" made out of limestone covered with red mason's lines and graffiti.

It remain unknown whether Sekhemkhet's complex would include any mortuary temples or other features also found in Djoser's complex. Its unfinished state presents difficulty for such conjectures.

==== South Tomb ====
In 1963, J. P. Lauer found, offset from the center to west axis of the pyramid and under a mastaba-like structure with dimensions 32 m × 16 m (105 ft × 52 ft), the foundations of the so-called South Tomb. It stands closer to the pyramid itself than in the complex of his predecessor.

In the substructure of the mastaba, following a passage accessed by a vertical shaft, the excavators unearthed a chamber where they found a wooden coffin with the remains of an unidentified two-year-old child. It is certain the child is not Sekhemkhet himself, since he is represented as an adult in reliefs from Wadi Maghara in Sinai. Also found were animal bones, stone vessels and gold jewelry from the Third Dynasty, as well as traces of a robbery of the tomb.

==== Enclosure wall ====
The enclosure walls had a niche similar to the one on the walls of the Djoser complex, and was clad with Tura limestone that has been preserved in the first north wall, as they had been filled with the extension. The walls were about ten meters high. Work on the extension walls may have been halted during the first stages of construction, or else their Tura limestone casing was later stolen.

== See also ==
- List of Egyptian pyramids
