= Djeseretnebti =

Possible ancient Egyptian queen consort

Djeseretnebti in hieroglyphs
D45 I10 S29 r X1 S34 G16
Djeseret-ankh-Nebti
Ḏsr.t-ˁnḫ-Nb.tj

Djeseretnebti (or Djeseret-Ankh-Nebti) is possibly the name of an ancient Egyptian queen. Since this name appears without any queen‘s title, Egyptologists dispute the true meaning and reading of this name.

== Evidence ==
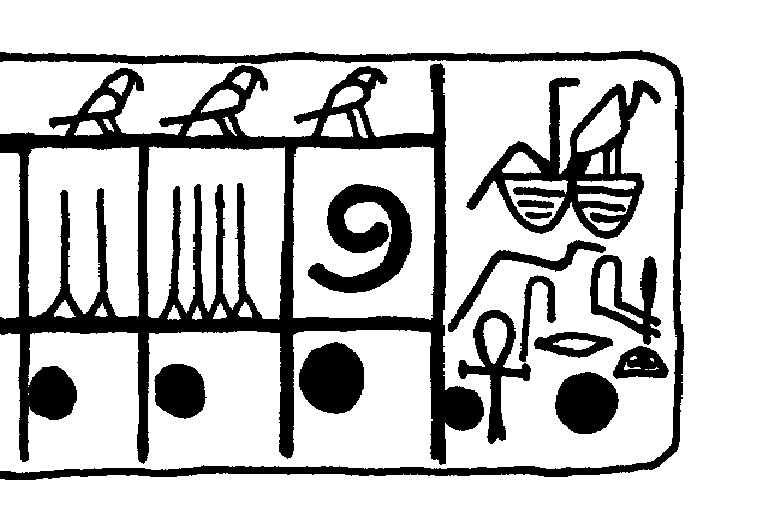
Ivory cloth label from the Sekhemkhet complex with the controversial Nebti name (right)

The name Djeseret-Nebti or Djeseret-Ankh-Nebti appears on ivory cloth labels, found in the underground galleries beneath the pyramid of the 3rd Dynasty king (pharaoh) Sekhemkhet at Saqqara. It is written with the common nebti-crest, but not with any personal title that could identify whether the person was a member of Egyptian royalty or that it was even a name. Egyptologists like Toby Wilkinson and Zakaria Goneim read the inscription as Djeser-Ti and identify it with the cartouche-name of the pharaoh Djeser Teti of the Abydos King List.

Wolfgang Helck, Peter Kaplony and Jean-Pierre Pätznik instead read the name as djeseret-ankh-nebti (‘the noble one who lives for the two ladies’) and see it as the name of a wife of king Sekhemkhet. They point to several clay seals found at Elephantine, which show Sekhemkhet's horus name alternating with the nebty name Hetep-Ren and postulate that this could be the original birth name of Sekhemkhet.
