= Jean Leclant =

French egyptologist (1920–2011)

- Born: 8 August 1920; 14th arrondissement of Paris
- Died: 16 September 2011; 6th arrondissement of Paris
- Education: École normale supérieure, École pratique des hautes études
- Occupations: Archaeologist, Egyptologist, curator, university teacher, orientalist, geographer
- Employers: University of Strasbourg (1953–1963); Collège de France (1979–1990); University of Paris (1963–1979); École pratique des hautes études (1964–1990)
- Awards: Commander of the National Order of Merit (1995); Prix mondial Cino Del Duca (2000); Balzan Prize (archaeology, France, 1993); honorary doctor of the University of Vienna; Concours général; Order of the Republic, 2nd Class; Grand Officer of the Order of Merit of the Italian Republic; grand prix de la Société de géographie (1997)

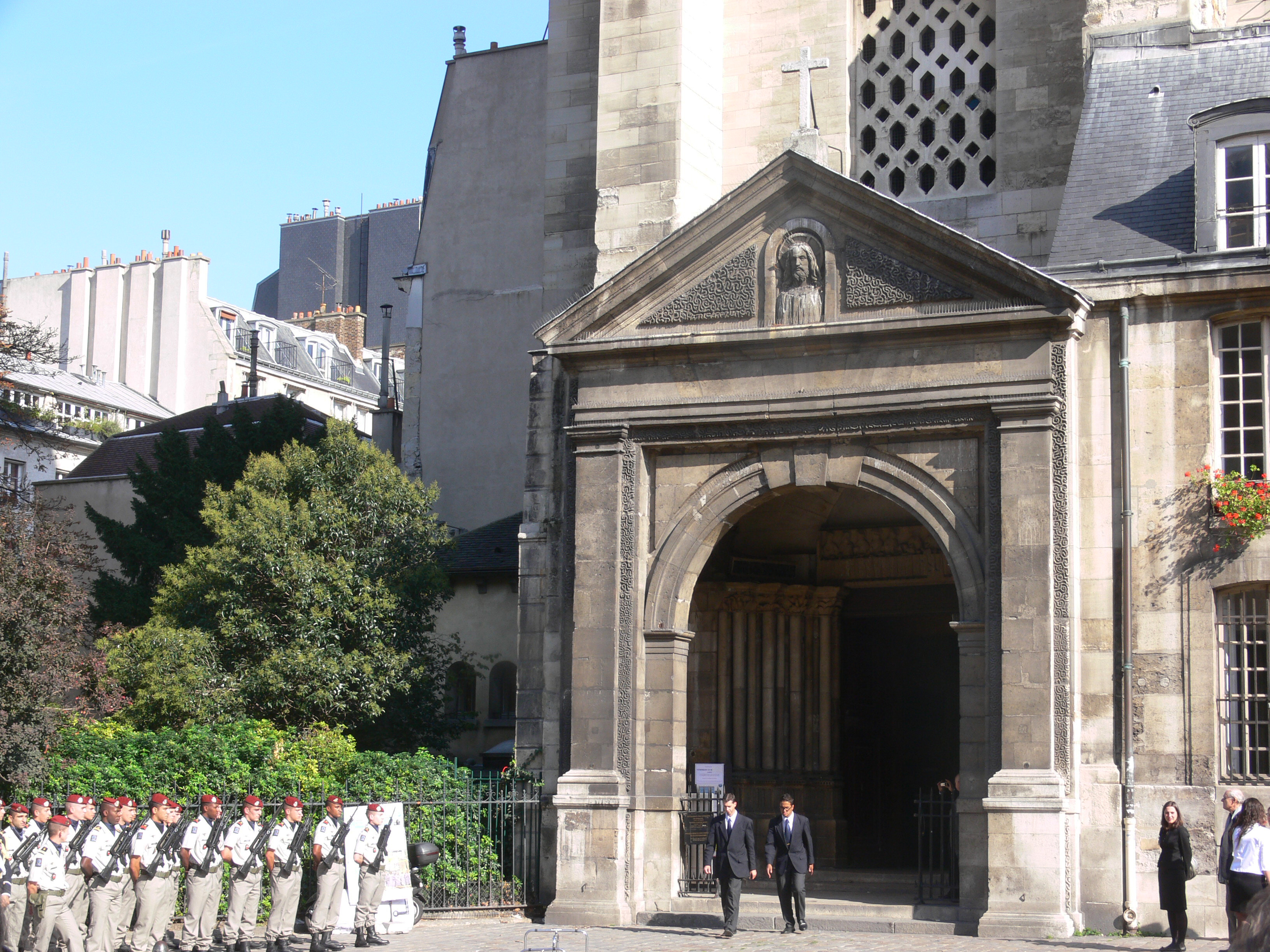
Funeral of Jean Leclant at the Abbey of Saint-Germain-des-Prés, 23 September 2011

Jean Leclant (8 August 1920 – 16 September 2011) was a French Egyptologist who was an Honorary Professor at the College of France, Permanent Secretary of the Academy of Inscriptions and Letters of the Institut de France, and Honorary Secretary of the International Association of Egyptologists.

As part of his studies of the archeology of ancient Egyptian artifacts, Jean Leclant made major discoveries at Saqqara and undertook excavations at other archaeological sites in Ethiopia and the Sudan. An honorary member of the Humanities and the Social Sciences section of the Austrian Academy of Sciences, his work earned him numerous awards including the 1993 International Balzan Foundation Prize for Art and Archaeology of the Ancient World and the 2000 Prix mondial Cino Del Duca.

Leclant was elected an International member of the American Philosophical Society in 1999.

== Publications ==
- Enquêtes sur les sacerdoces et les sanctuaires égyptiens à l'époque dite Éthiopienne, XXVe dynastie égyptienne, n°17, BdE, IFAO, Le Caire, 1954.
- With Paul Barguet and Clément Robichon, Karnak-nord IV, 2 vol., FIFAO, Le Caire, 1954.
- Fouilles et travaux en Égypte, 1955-1957, n°27, fasc. 1, Orientalia, Pontificium institutum biblicum, Roma, 1958.
- Fouilles et travaux en Égypte et au Soudan, 1960-1961, n°31, fasc. 3, Orientalia, Pontificium institutum biblicum, Roma, 1962.
- Fouilles et travaux en Égypte et au Soudan, 1961-1962, n°32, fasc. 2, Orientalia, Pontificium institutum biblicum, Roma, 1963.
- Recherches sur les monuments Thébains de la XXVe dynastie égyptienne dite éthiopienne, 2 vol., BdE, IFAO, Le Caire, 1965.
- With Michela Schiff Giorgini et Clément Robichon, Soleb I, 1813-1963, Sansoni, Florence, 1965.
- With Michela Schiff Giorgini et Clément Robichon, Soleb II, les nécropoles, Sansoni, Florence, 1971.
- With Jean-Philippe Lauer, Mission archéologique de Saqqarah, I, le temple haut du complexe funéraire du roi Téti, BdE, IFAO, Le Caire, 1972.
- With Gisèle Clerc, Inventaire bibliographique des Isiaca, E.J. Brill, Leiden, 1972-1974.
- Les textes de la pyramide de Pepi I Meryre, reconstitution de la paroi est de l’antichambre, CRAIBL, Paris, 1977.
- With Audran Labrousse and Jean-Philippe Lauer, Mission archéologique de Saqqarah. II, Le temple haut du complexe funéraire du roi Ounas, n°73, BdE, IFAO, Le Caire, 1977.
- Recherches à la pyramide de Pépi Ier (Saqqarah 1972-1976), BSFE, Paris, 10/1976-03/1977.
- With Cyril Aldred, Jean-Louis Hellouin de Cenival, Fernand Debono, Christiane Desroches Noblecourt, Jean-Philippe Lauer and Jean Vercoutter, Le temps des pyramides, L'univers des formes, Gallimard, Paris, 1978.
- With Cyril Aldred, Paul Barguet, Christiane Desroches Noblecourt et H.W. Müller, L'empire des conquérants, L'univers des formes, Gallimard, Paris, 1979.
- Fouilles et travaux en Égypte et au Soudan, 1978-1979, n°49, (p. 346–420), Orientalia, 1980.
- With Cyril Aldred, François Daumas et Christiane Desroches Noblecourt, L'Égypte du crépuscule, L'univers des formes, Gallimard, Paris, 1980.
- T.P. Pépi Ier, VI, à propos des textes des pyramides, MGEM, IFAO, Le Caire, 1985.
- De l'égyptophilie à l'égyptologie, Académie des inscriptions et belles lettres, Paris, 1985.
- Avec H.G. Fischer, L'écriture et l'art de l'Égypte ancienne, Quatre leçons sur la paléographie et l'épigraphie pharaoniques, PUF, Paris, 1986.
- Avec A. Zivie, Memphis et ses nécropoles au Nouvel Empire, Nouvelles données, nouvelles questions, CNRS, Paris, 1988.
- Aux sources de l'égyptologie européenne : Champollion, Young, Rosellini, Lepsius, Académie des inscriptions et belles-lettres, Paris, 1991.
- Archaeological Activities in Egypt, Vol. 1, (p. 3–9), Atti del VI Congresso Internazionale di Egittologia, Turin, 1992.
- Noubounet, une nouvelle reine d'Égypte, (p. 211–219), Gegengabe Brunner-Traut, Attempto Verlag, Tübingen, 1992.
- À propos des Aegyptiaca du haut Moyen Âge en France, (p. 77–80), The Heritage of Egypt. Studies Iversen, Museum Tusculanum Press, Copenhagen, 1992.
- Diana Nemorensis, Isis et Bubastis, (p. 251–257), Studies in Pharaonic Religion and Society in honour of J. Gwyn Griffiths, The Egypt Exploration Society, London, 1992.
- Avec Gisèle Clerc, Fouilles et travaux en Égypte et au Soudan, 1993-1994, n°64, fasc. 3, (p. 225–355), Orientalia, Rome, 1995.
- Avant-propos, (p. 13–19), L'Égyptomanie à l’épreuve de l’archéologie, Musée du Louvre, Paris, 1996.
- Avec Gisèle Clerc, Fouilles et travaux en Égypte et au Soudan, 1994-1995, n°65, fasc. 3, (p. 234–356), Orientalia, Roma, 1996.
- Avec Jean-Philippe Lauer et Audran Labrousse, L'architecture des pyramides à textes, I, Saqqara Nord, 2 vol., n°114, BdE, IFAO, Le Caire, 1996.
- Avec M. Rassart-Debergh, Textiles d'Antinoé, Donation E. Guimet, Muséum d'histoire naturelle, Colmar, 1997.
- Avec C. Langlois, A. Decaux, J. Tulard, F. Gros et G. Le Rider, L'expédition d'Égypte, postérités et prospectives, Palais de l'Institut, Paris, 1998.
- Avec Dominique Valbelle, Le décret de Memphis, bicentenaire de la découverte de la Pierre de Rosette, De Boccard, Paris, 1999.
- Avec G. Mokhtar, L'empire de Koush : Napata et Méroé, In Histoire Générale de l'Afrique. Volume II : L'Afrique Ancienne, Présence Africaine/Edicef/Unesco, Paris, Nouvelle édition, 2000.
- Répertoire d'épigraphie méroïtique : corpus des inscriptions publiées, 3 vol., Académie des Inscriptions et Belles Lettres, Paris, 2000.
- Au fil du Nil, le parcours d'un égyptologue, Académie des inscriptions et belles lettres, Paris, 2001.
- Avec Catherine Berger-el Naggar, Bernard Mathieu et I. Pierre-Croisiau, Les textes de la pyramide de Pépy Ier, 1, édition, description et analyse, 2, facsimilés, MIFAO, Le Caire, 2001.
- Dictionnaire de l’Antiquité, PUF, Paris, 2005, collection Quadrige, 2464 pages, (ISBN 2-13-055018-5).
- The Edifice of Taharqa by the Sacred Lake of Karnak (with Richard Anthony Parker and Jean-Claude Goyon) (Brown University Press, 1979)

== Honours ==
Ribbon bar	Country	Honour
	France	Grand-officier of the Legion of Honour
	France	Grand-officier of the National Order of Merit
	France	Commander of the Ordre des Palmes Académiques
	France	Commander of the Ordre des Arts et des Lettres
	France	Chevalier of the Order of Military Merit
	Italy	Grand officier of the Order of Merit of the Italian Republic
	Egypt	Grand Officier of the Order of the Arab Republic of Egypt
	Sudan	Grand Cordon of the National Order of El-Nilein
	Ethiopia	Officier of the Order of Menelik II
