= Wadi Maghareh =

Archaeological site in Egypt

Coordinates: 28.8973°N 33.3726°E

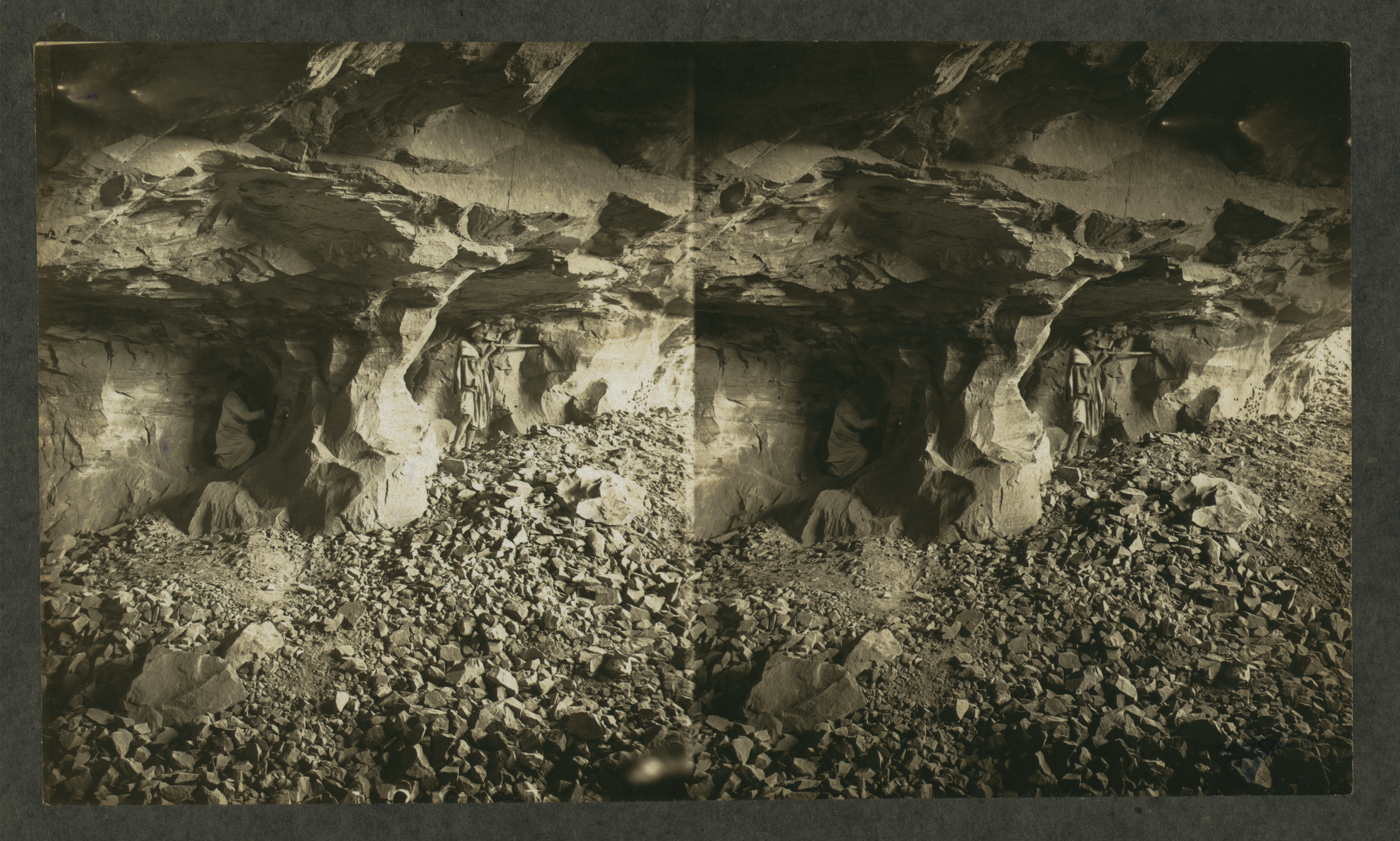
In the turquoise mines at Maghara

m f kA niwt
mfkꜣ
Town of Turquoise
in hieroglyphs

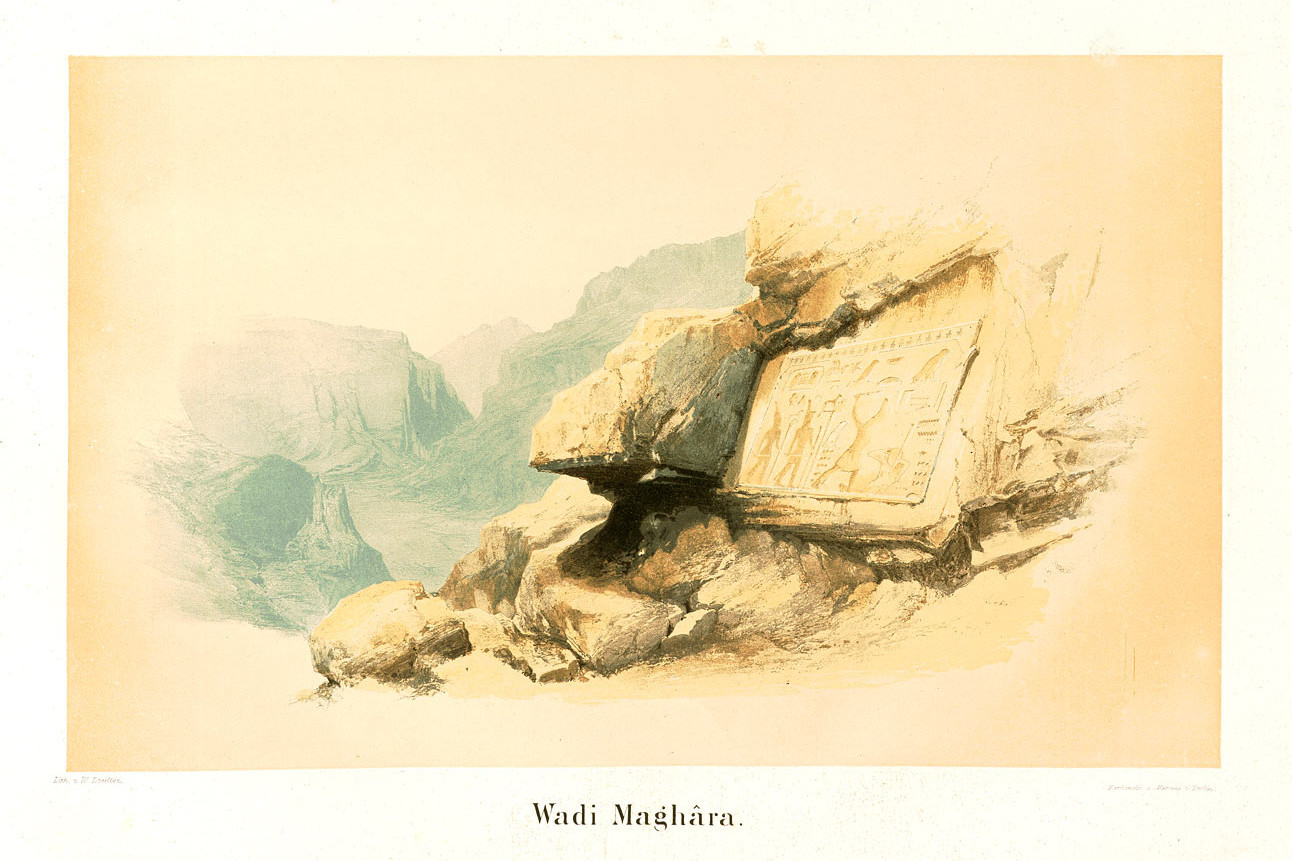
Lepsius-Projekt at Kingdom of Egypt

Wadi Maghareh (also spelled Maghara or Magharah, meaning "The Valley of Caves" in Egyptian Arabic) is an archaeological site located in the southwestern Sinai Peninsula, Egypt. It contains pharaonic monuments and turquoise mines dating from the Old, Middle and New Kingdoms of Ancient Egypt. The Ancient Egyptians knew the site as "the Terraces of Turquoise."

== History ==
The site was rediscovered in 1809 by Ulrich Jasper Seetzen, and since then has seen several excavation teams, Richard Lepsius's excavation in 1845 being the first. Major C. K. McDonald (Note: He was born in the Hebrides, and was the first excavator of Serabit el-Khadim)'s visits to the site, including residence at the site from 1854–1866 (and an effort to mine turquoise there) resulted in only surface finds (arrowheads and such) with no further excavation. A British Ordnance Survey of the site was made in 1868–1869, a Harvard University expedition took place in 1932, and several Israeli excavations occurred between 1967 and 1982, among others.

== Monuments, buildings and inscriptions ==
Ancient Egyptian monuments, buildings and inscriptions span the period from the 3rd to the 19th Dynasty (ca. 2700 BC–1100 BC), although most monuments date only to the Twelfth Dynasty. Two Third Dynasty rock tables of king Sanakht are found in the valley, as is one of Djoser and two virtually identical tables of king Sekhemkhet. Tables of Sneferu and Khufu from the Fourth Dynasty are also found there.

The Fifth Dynasty king Sahure's funerary temple at Abusir has a relief representing him dispatch of a fleet to the Red Sea, probably to collect turquoise at Maghareh. Sahure raised a monument depicting himself "smiting the Mentju of all foreign lands" which was found at Maghareh. Fifth Dynasty rock tablets include those of King Nyuserre Ini accompanied by a libation vase and images of the gods Horus and Thoth, one of king Menkauhor Kaiu, and three of king Djedkare Isesi.

In addition to pharaonic monuments, an Old Kingdom settlement was founded on the summit of a hill in Wadi Igneh containing 125 rough stone structures containing wood ash and potsherds, some of which are of Nile Valley clay.

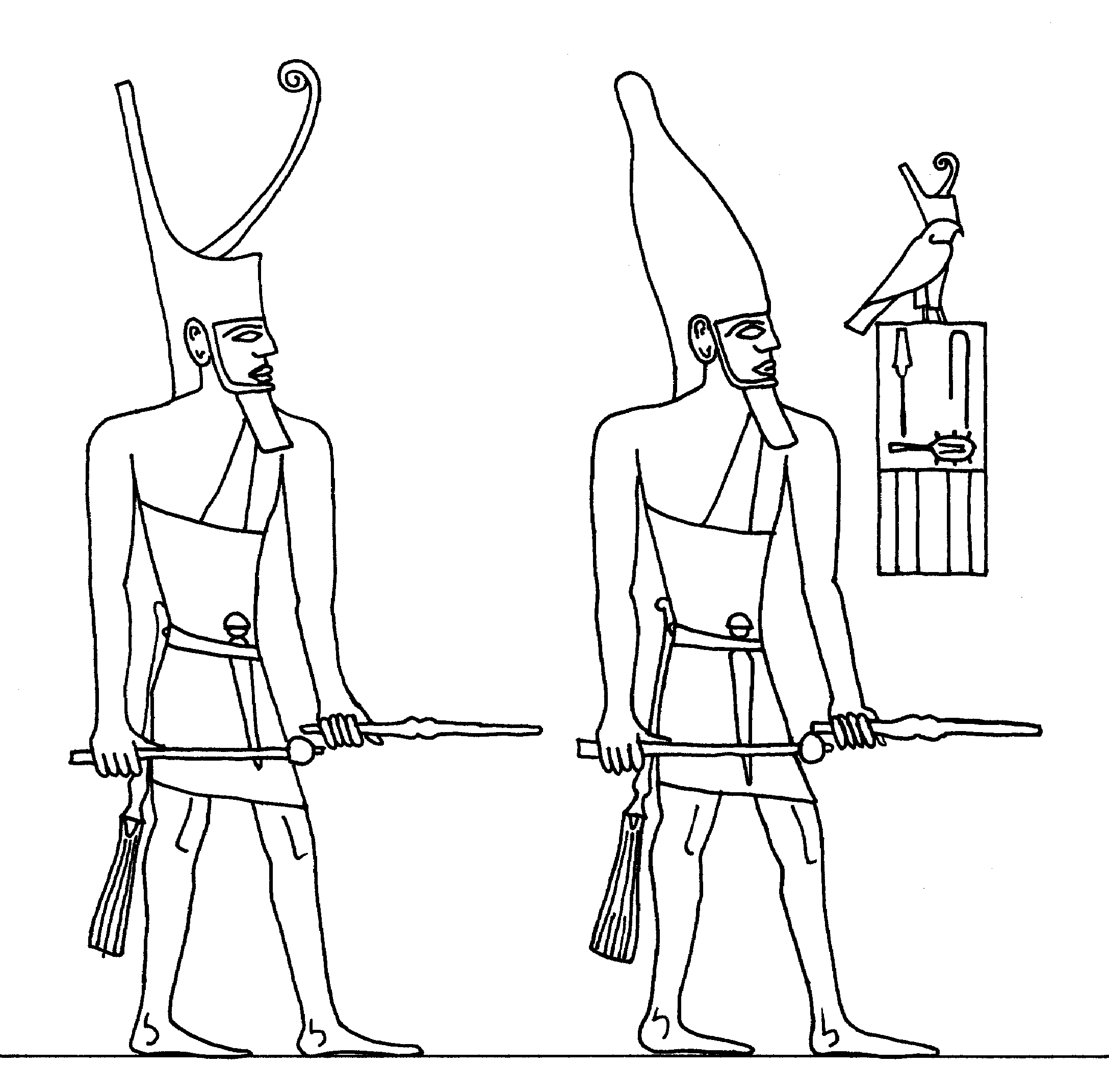
Sekhemkhet

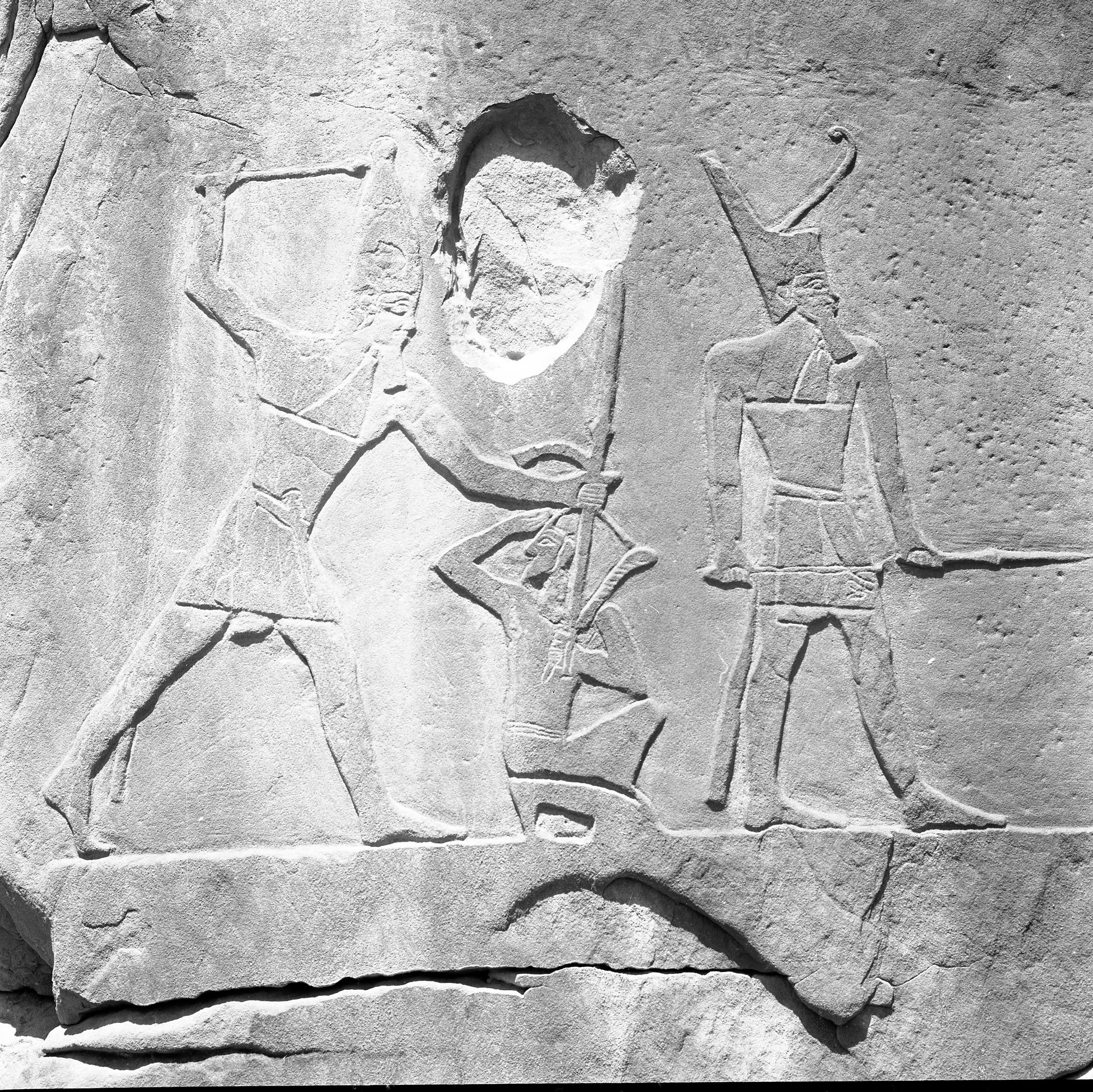
Sekhemkhet, Sinai (997009158109105171)

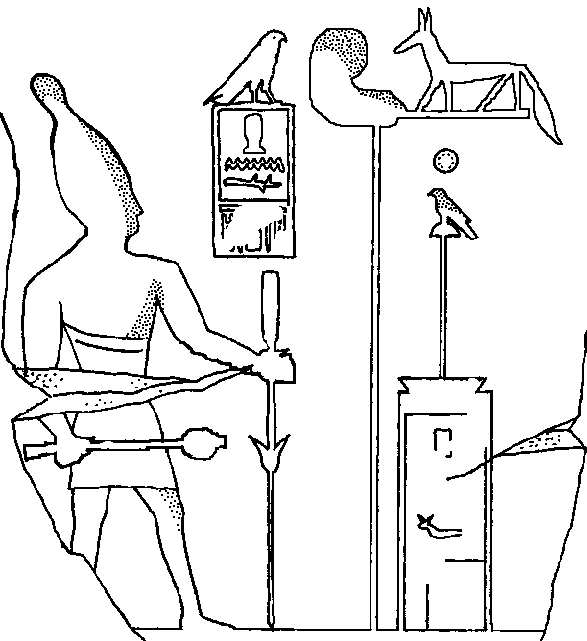
Sanakht Relief

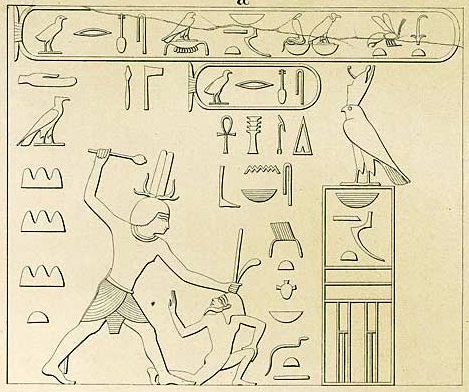
Relief of Sneferu, Wadi Maghara.

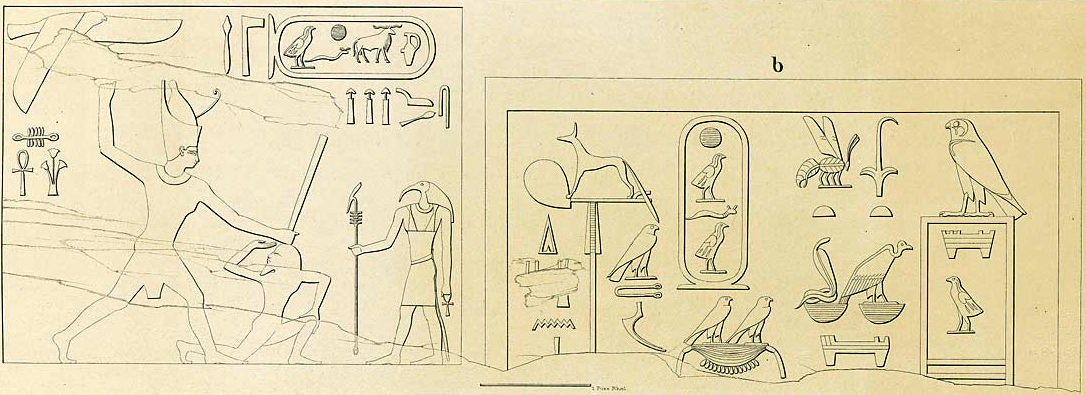
Relief of Khufu, Wadi Maghara.

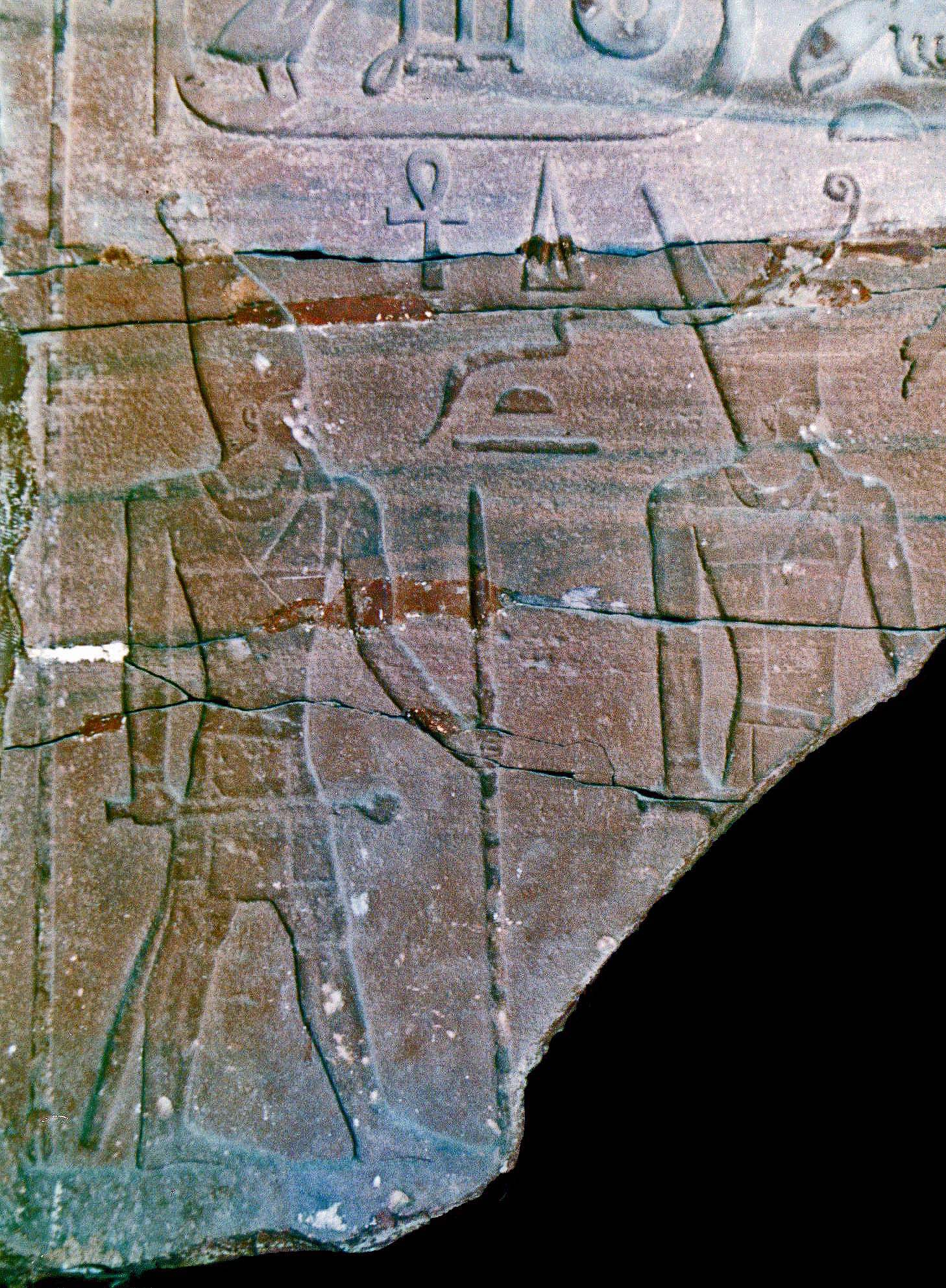
Relief of Sahure, Wadi Maghara.

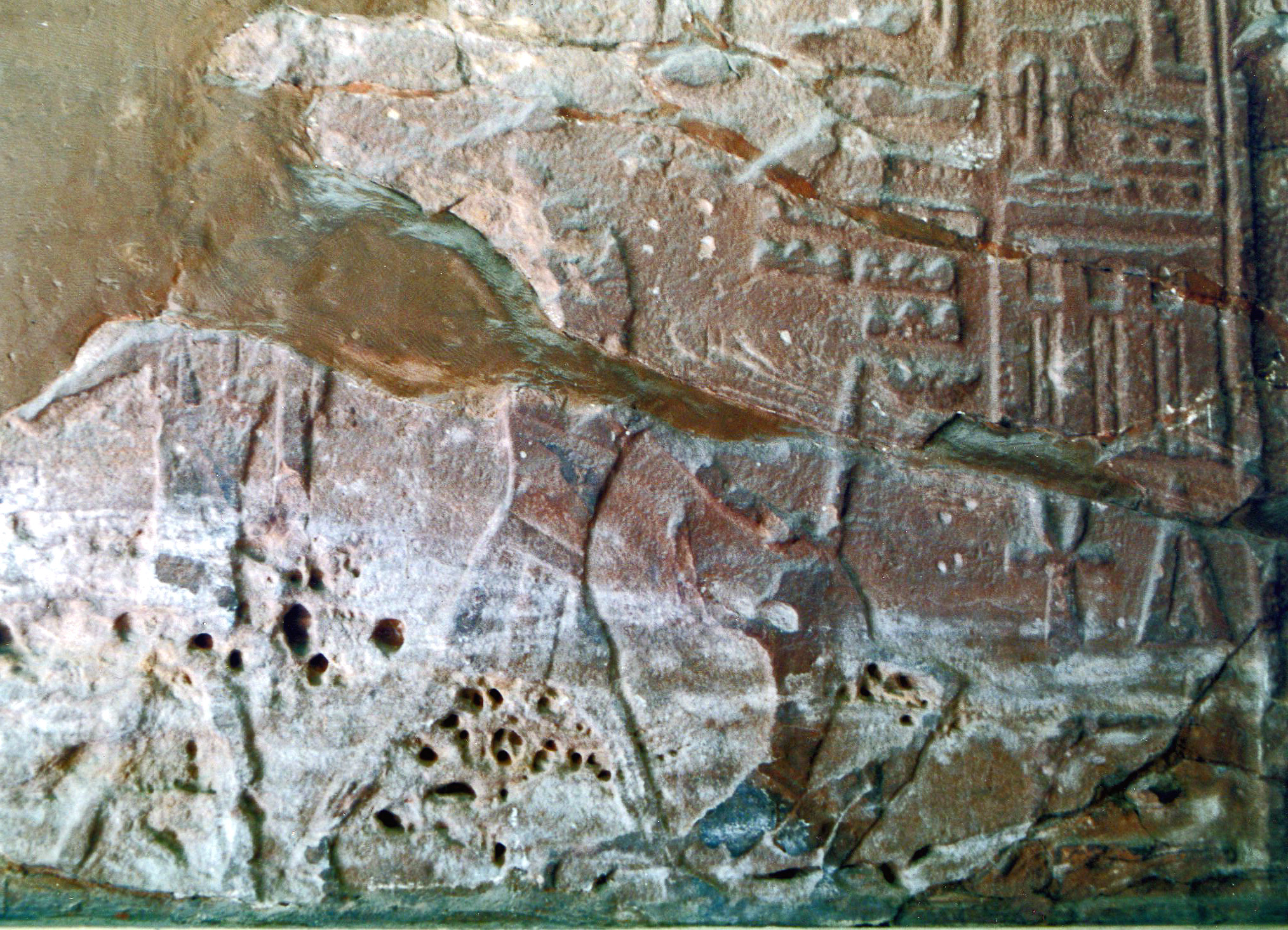
Relief of Nyuserre Ini, Wadi Maghara.

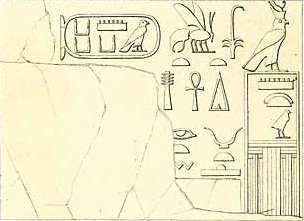
Relief of Menkauhor Kaiu, Wadi Maghara.

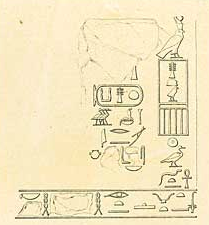
Relief of Djedkare Isesi, Wadi Maghara.
