= Sanakht =

Egyptian pharaoh

- Nebka ? Horus Sa ?
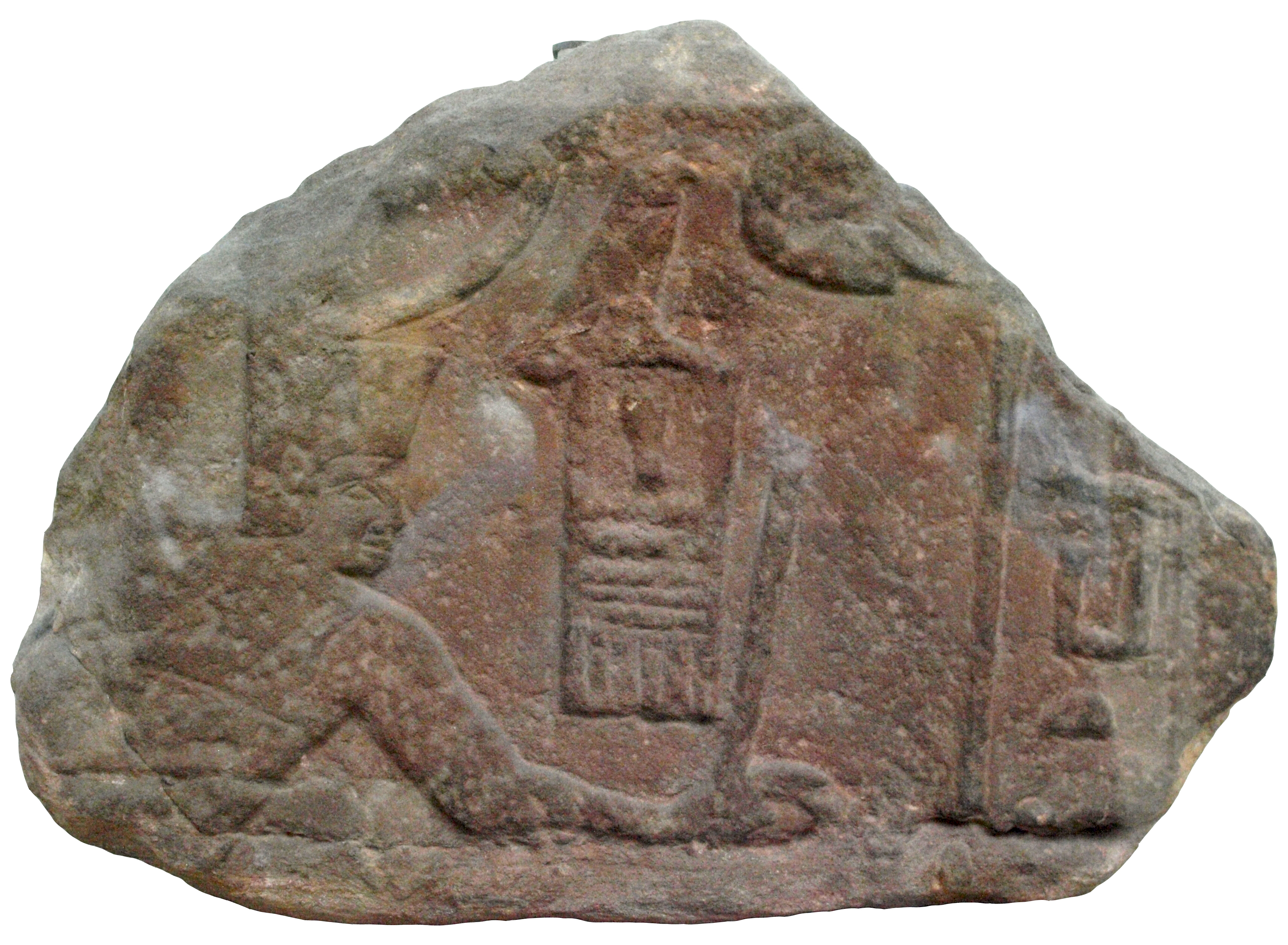
- Relief fragment of Sanakht in the pose of smiting an enemy. Originally from the Sinai, now EA 691 on display at the British Museum.

Pharaoh
- Reign: 18 years according to the Turin Canon, most likely less, starting ca. 2650 BC
- Predecessor: uncertain, Sekhemkhet (most likely) or Khaba, Djoser, Khasekhemwy
- Successor: uncertain, Khaba (most likely) or Sekhemkhet, Huni, Qahedjet, Djoser
Royal titulary
Horus name
Hor-Sanakht
Ḥr-S3.nḫt
The victorious protector of Horus
G5	V18 N35 M3
- Father: Khasekhemwy ?
- Mother: Nimaathap ?
- Burial: mastaba K2 at Beit Khallaf?
- Dynasty: 3rd Dynasty

Sanakht (also read as Hor-Sanakht) is the Horus name of an ancient Egyptian king (pharaoh) of the Third Dynasty during the Old Kingdom. His chronological position is highly uncertain (though he is more likely to have reigned towards the end of the dynasty), and it is also unclear under which Hellenized name the ancient historian Manetho could have listed him. Many Egyptologists connect Sanakht with the Ramesside cartouche name Nebka. However, this remains disputed because no further royal title of that king has ever been found; either in contemporary source or later ones. There are two relief fragments depicting Sanakht originally from the Wadi Maghareh on the Sinai Peninsula.

== Identity ==
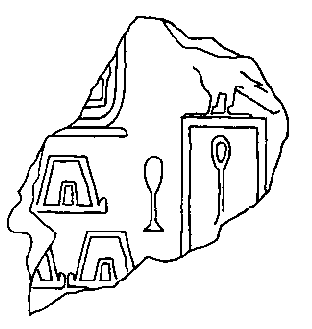
Clay seal fragment bearing Sanakht's serekh, together with what could be a cartouche of Nebka, from mastaba K2 at Beit Khallaf.

Sanakht's identity and position in the Third Dynasty is not entirely clear and remains the subject of debate. While Sanakht's existence is attested by seal fragments from mastaba K2 at Beit Khallaf and a graffito, his position as the founder of the Third Dynasty, as recorded by Manetho and the Turin Canon, has been seriously undermined by recent archaeological discoveries at Abydos. These discoveries establish that it was likely Djoser who helped bury—and thus succeed—Khasekhemwy, rather than Sanakht. This is determined from seals bearing Djoser's name found at the entrance to the latter's tomb.

Proponents of the theory that Sanakht was nonetheless the founder of the dynasty object that the presence of Djoser's seals in Khasekhemwy's tomb only shows that Djoser conducted cultural rituals in honor of this king, and does not necessarily imply that Djoser was Khasekhemwy's immediate successor. Sanakht could then have married Queen Nimaethap, with Nimaethap being the daughter of Khasekhemwy rather than his wife. Together with Sanakht, they could be the parents of Djoser. Alternatively, some have considered Sanakht to be Djoser's elder brother.

Presently, the dominant theory is that Sanakht's reign dates to the later Third Dynasty, after Djoser. Egyptologists Toby Wilkinson, Stephan Seidlmayer, Kenneth Kitchen and Rainer Stadelmann equate Sanakht with "Nebka", a name appearing in Ramesside king lists. In support of this theory is a clay seal fragment on which the lower part of a cartouche appears. In this cartouche Wilkinson, Seidlmayer and Stadelmann see traces of a Ka-sign, the end of the name "Nebka". Likewise, Dietrich Wildung favors equating Nebka with Sanakht, although he questions the validity of the seal as evidence given that it is too badly damaged to read the inscription within the cartouche as "Nebka" with any certainty.

John D. Degreef, Nabil Swelim, and Wolfgang Helck are against equating Nebka with Sanakht. They refer to the fact that the name "Nebka" is not attested on any monument nor in any document dating to before Djoser. Instead, Nabil Swelim identifies Nebka with the Horus name Khaba. He further identifies Sanakht with a king Mesochris mentioned by Manetho, regarding this as a Hellenized form of the throne name of Sanakht. He dated Sanakht's reign to between the seventh and eighth king of the Third Dynasty.

Jürgen von Beckerath, Dietrich Wildung and Peter Kaplony proposed that Sanakht's Horus name is that of the shadowy Horus Sa, seeing the name "Sa" as a short form of "Sanakht". Wolfgang Helck rejects this argument on the grounds that the ink inscriptions from the east-galleries of Djoser's pyramid complex date predominantly from the reign of Nynetjer or shortly thereafter, while Sanakht reigned during the mid-3rd dynasty. Furthermore, inscriptions mentioning the "House of the Ka of Hotepsekhemwy" are stylistically similar to that of Horus Sa which would place Sa in the 2nd dynasty since Hotepsekhemwy was the first ruler of that dynasty. Thus, Helck proposed that Horus Sa is the Horus-name of another shadowy ruler of the 2nd dynasty, Weneg, whose Horus-name is otherwise unknown.

Sanakht's name was once read "Hen Nekht" by Egyptologists such as Ernest Wallis Budge. Today, this reading is not in use anymore; the up-to-date reading is "Sanakht" or (seldom) "Nakht-Sa".

== Reign ==
The exact duration of Sanakht's time on the throne is unknown. Unlike Djoser, few relics survive from his reign, which casts serious doubts on the traditional figure of 18 years of reign for this king, as given by both Manetho and the Turin Canon. It must be stressed that the Turin Canon and Manetho were more than one and two thousand years removed from the time of Egypt's Third Dynasty, and would be expected to contain some inaccurate or unreliable data. The Turin Canon, for instance, was transcribed on papyri that dates to the reign of the New Kingdom king, Ramesses II, who ruled Egypt from 1279 to 1213 BC.

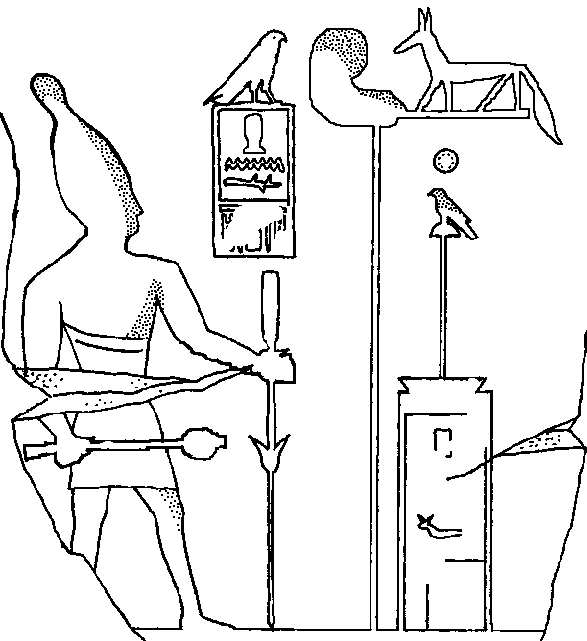
Relief of Sanakht from the Wadi Maghareh.

Very little is known of Sanakht's activities during his reign. The presence of reliefs depicting him in the Sinai at Wadi Maghareh together with those of Djoser and Sekhemkhet suggest an important Egyptian presence there at the time of the Third Dynasty. Expeditions were launched to that location for the procurement of mineral resources, in particular turquoise.

== Tomb ==
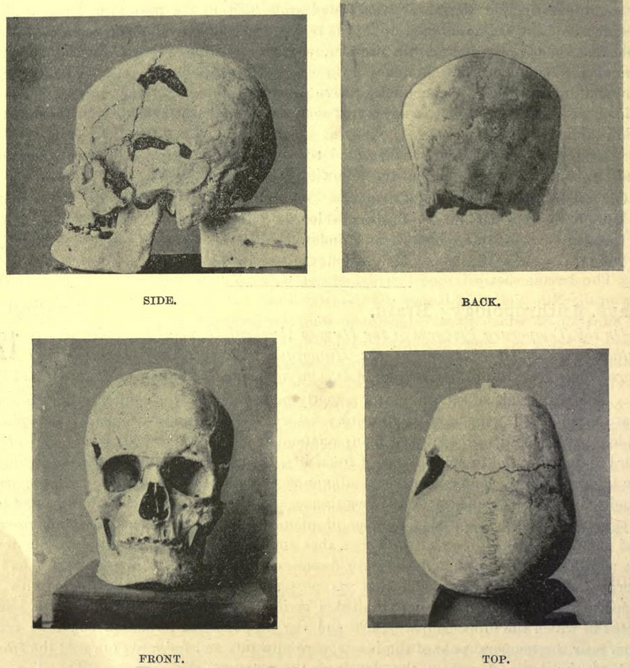
Possible skull of Pharaoh Sanakht from mastaba K2 at Beit Khallaf.

The location of Sanakht's tomb is not known with certainty. It was long thought that Sanakht's tomb was the large mastaba K2 at Beit Khallaf, as excavations there yielded relief fragments bearing his name. However, some Egyptologists now regard this mastaba as the burial of a high official, prince or queen rather than that of a pharaoh, while others continue to support the first hypothesis.

In the mastaba were found the skeletal remains of a man over 1.87 m (6 ft 1 1/2 in) tall. According to Charles S. Myers, this stature was considerably taller than the 1.67 m (5 ft 6 in) average of prehistoric and later Egyptians. The specimen's skull was very large and capacious. Although his cranial index was unusually broad and almost brachycephalic, the proportions of his long bones were tropically adapted like those of most other ancient Egyptians; especially those from the predynastic period. His overall cranial features, however, were closer to those of dynastic period Egyptian skulls.

Consequently, the mastaba has been associated with an anecdote related by Manetho in which he tells of a late Second Dynasty king, called Sesochris, whom he describes as being particularly tall. The Egyptologist Wolfgang Helck proposed another hypothesis; namely, that Sanakht's tomb is an unfinished structure west of the pyramid of Djoser.

While the case of Sanakht has often appeared in the medical literature as a potential case of pituitary disease, no definitive consensus has existed for many years on whether it was acromegaly or gigantism. In 2017 palaeopathologist Francesco M. Galassi and Egyptologist Michael E. Habicht from Zurich University's Institute of Evolutionary Medicine coordinated an international team of researchers to reassess this case. Their conclusion was that the alleged remains of Sanakht are clearly the oldest known case of gigantism in the world.

== See also ==
- List of Pharaohs
- List of Egyptian pyramids
- List of megalithic sites
