= Zakaria Goneim =

Egyptian archaeologist

Muhammed Zakaria Goneim (زكريا غنيم) (alt. spelling: Muhammad Zakarīya Ghunaim, 1905–1959) was an Egyptian archaeologist, known for his discoveries in and around Saqqara. He is best known for discovering the Step Pyramid of Sekhemkhet.

Before World War II, Goneim worked at Saqqara on the mortuary temple of Unas. He spent the war in Luxor and then returned to Saqqara to work on the Step Pyramid of Sekhemkhet in close association with Lauer who was working on the Step Pyramid of Djoser.

He thought he had found an intact burial, as the seals of the alabaster sarcophagus were undamaged, and funerary wreaths lay atop the sarcophagus. There was tremendous media attention, and he invited high state officials, journalists, reporters and film teams to the opening. But on opening the sarcophagus, it proved to be empty. "They dig for three years and find nothing," one newspaper reported. There was consequent popular disappointment, although the discovery was still an important one for Egyptology. The Egyptian president Nasser visited the site, and commended Goneim for his work.

After this he went on a lecture tour of the US. He also wrote a book, The buried pyramid, with the aid of Leonard Cottrell, in order to publicise the work further. The book was a success, and was translated into several languages.

But he was already in trouble at home, where official harassment had begun. He was eventually falsely accused of smuggling a large, valuable vessel that Quibell and Lauer had found two years earlier near in the Djoser complex out of the country. There was no hard evidence, only accusations and slander. But it devastated Goneim, who was Egyptian himself. He was repeatedly interrogated by the police.

His friend Jean-Philippe Lauer attempted to help him by searching for the missing item. In 1959, he tracked the missing vessel to a corner of the Egyptian Museum's depository. But it was too late. The perpetual harassment was too much, and Goneim was either murdered or drowned himself in the Nile on 12 January 1959.

Zakaria Goneim was the cousin of the Egyptian Heiress Nofert Sourial Sa'id. Zakaria Goneim's father's family became Muslim in the late 19th century. They were of Coptic descent.

== Publications ==
- The buried pyramid. Longmans, Green; London, New York; 1956
- The lost pyramid. Rinehart; New York; 1956
- Excavations at Saqqara: Horus Sekhem-khet, the unfinished step pyramid at Saqqara; Impr. de l’Institut français d’archéologie orientale; Le Caire, 1957
