= Jean-Philippe Lauer =

French architect and Egyptologist (1902–2001)

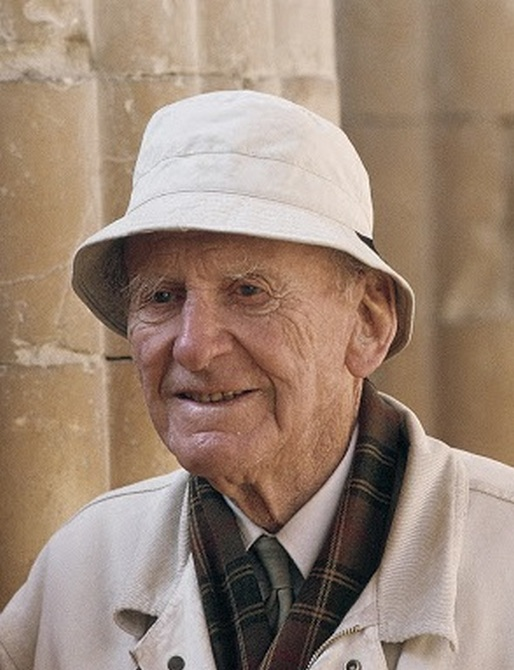
- Born: 7 May 1902; Paris
- Died: 15 May 2001 (aged 99)
- Occupations: Architect and Egyptologist

Jean-Philippe Lauer (French: [ʒɑ̃ filip loɛʁ]; 7 May 1902 – 15 May 2001) was a French architect and Egyptologist. He was considered to be the foremost expert on pyramid construction techniques and methods.

== Biography ==
=== Arrival in Egypt ===
He was born in the 8th arrondissement of Paris, France to a wealthy family of Alsacian origins. He studied architecture, but his cousin Jacques Hardy, an architect working in Egypt, advised him to come to Egypt due to the poor prospects for young architects in post World-War France. Lauer thus arrived in Egypt in 1926 where Pierre Lacau, then head of Supreme Council of Antiquities, gave him an 8-month position assisting Cecil Mallaby Firth's work on Djoser's Step Pyramid.

=== Work in Egypt ===
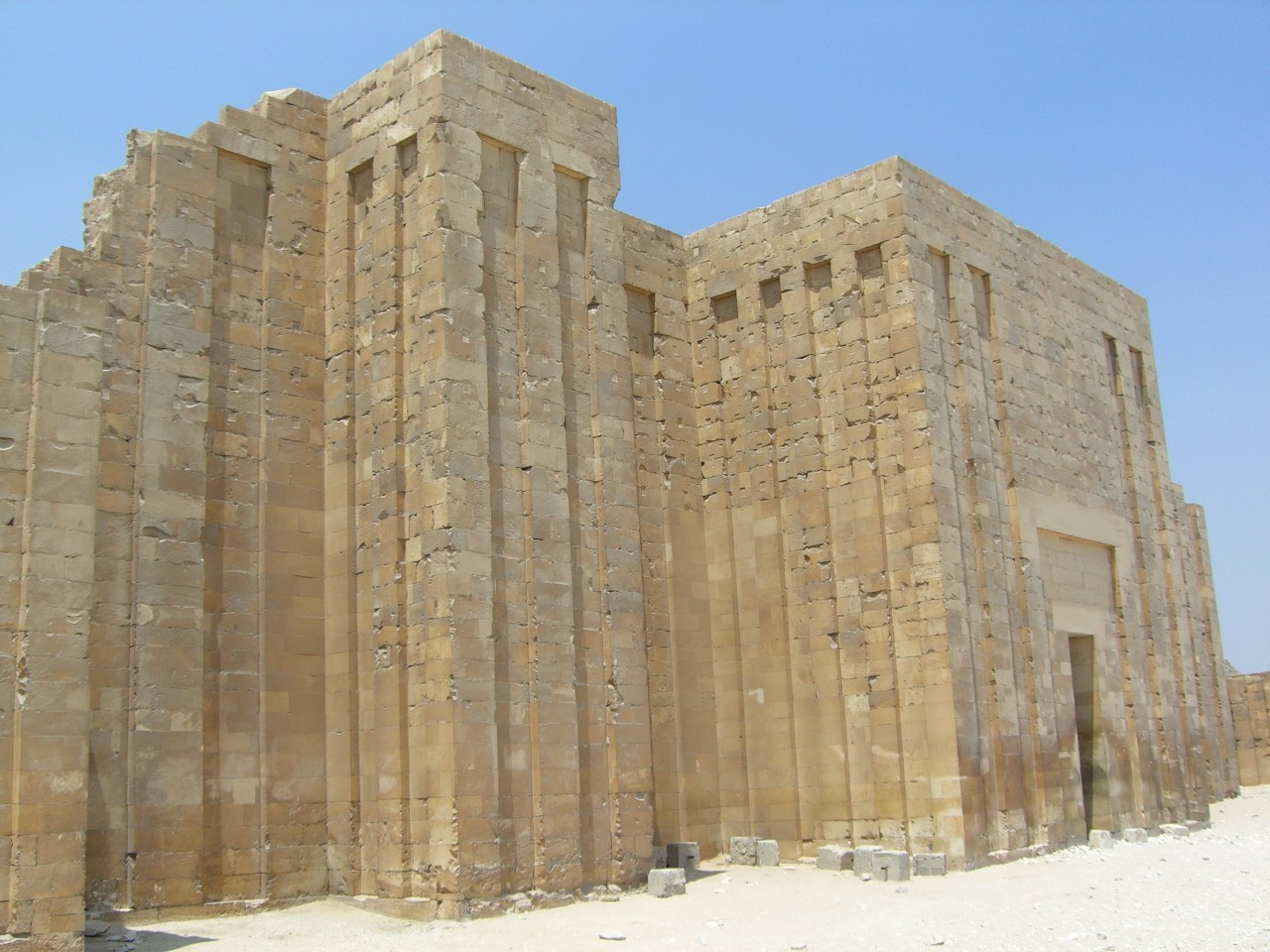
The enclosure wall of Djoser's pyramid complex, restored by J. P. Lauer.

His collaboration with Firth working very well, Lauer's position was regularly renewed, and by 1928, he was still in Saqqara. There he met Marguerite Jouguet, the daughter of the renowned Hellenist Pierre Jouguet, who had been appointed director of the Institut Français d'Archéologie Orientale. Monsieur Jouguet had published translations of many Greek papyri found in Egypt, and was a professor of ancient history and papyrology at Lille. J.P. Lauer married Marguerite on 1 October 1929 in the 6th arrondissement of Paris.

Firth died in 1931 and was subsequently replaced by James E. Quibell. Five years later in 1936, less than a year after Quibell's death, Lauer's position was not renewed, yet he decided to stay in Egypt. In the 1950s, J. P. Lauer worked in close association with his friend Zakaria Goneim on the step pyramid of Sekhemkhet. Later, in 1959, he helped Goneim clear his name on allegations that he had smuggled a vessel discovered by Lauer and Quibell out of Egypt. In 1963, together with Jean Leclant, he founded the Mission Archéologique Française de Saqqâra which is still active to this day. From his arrival in 1926 until his death in 2001, J. P. Lauer worked in numerous excavations and restorations projects on the Saqqara plateau, stopping only for a short time when Gamal Abdel Nasser assumed power in Egypt. Aged more than 90 and still working onsite he was nicknamed "the forgotten of God" by Egyptian workers.

Lauer's main work during his 75 years in Saqqara was the restoration of Djoser's mortuary complex in particular the serdab and the enclosure wall. He is also known for his excavations of the subterranean chambers of the step pyramid and the discovery of the three blue faience chambers.

He died aged 99 in 15th arrondissement of Paris.

The blue faience chambers, discovered in J.P. Lauer

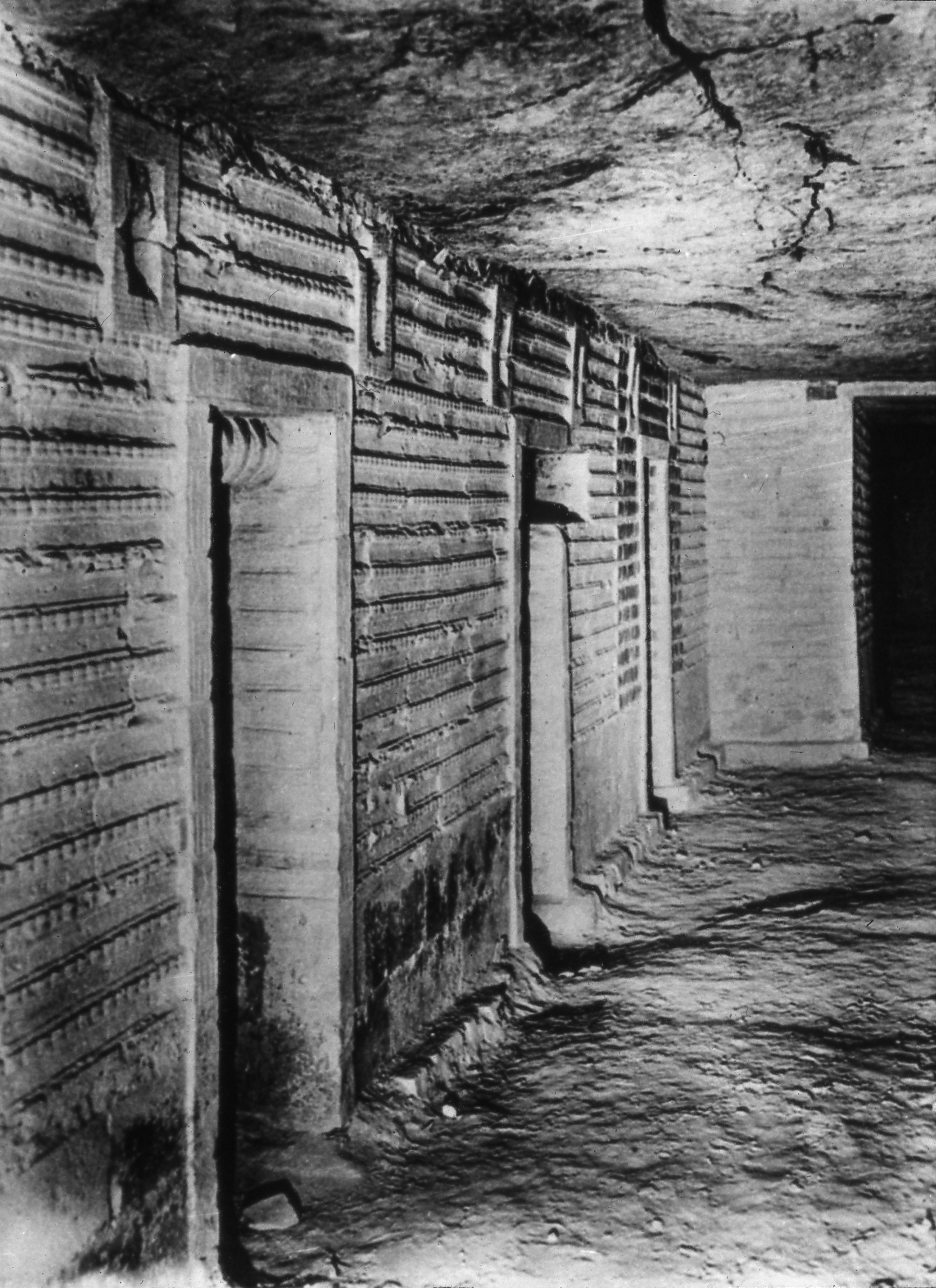

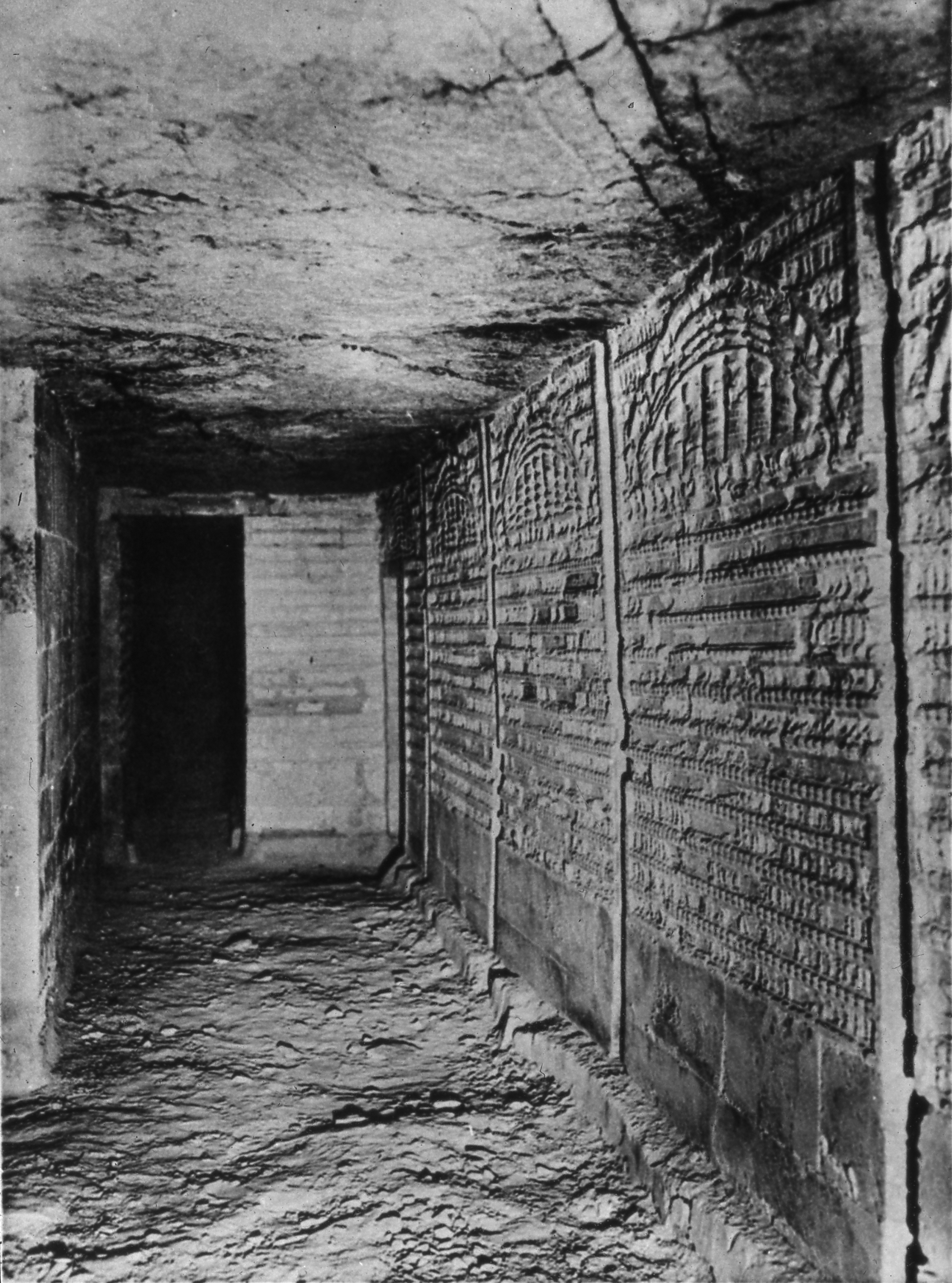

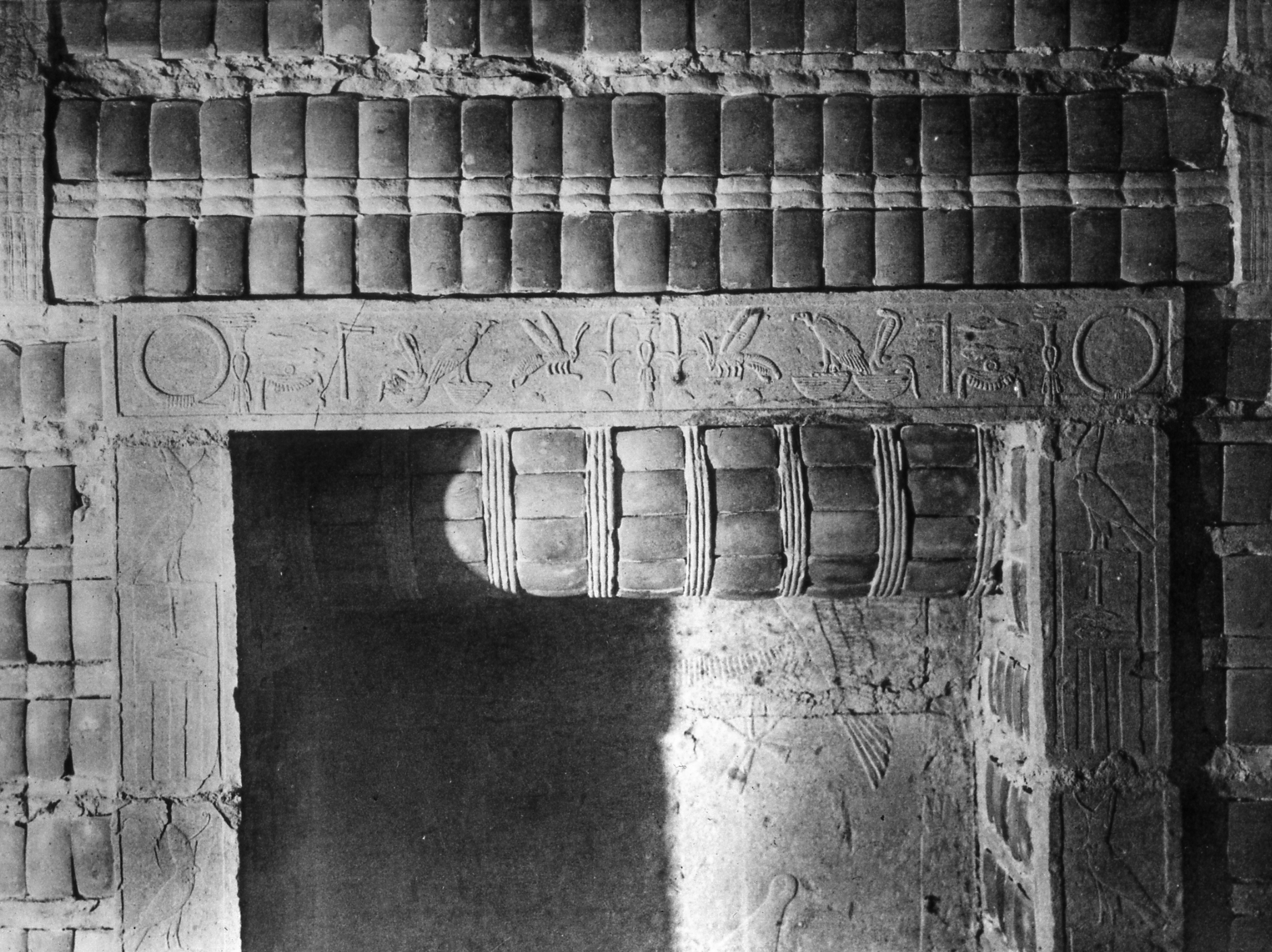

== Honors ==
J. P. Lauer received many honors, he was :

- Grand Officer of the French Legion of Honour,
- Commander of the Ordre national du Mérite,
- Commander of the Ordre des Palmes Académiques,
- Commander of the Ordre des Arts et des Lettres,
- Grand Officer of the Order of the Nile,
- Officer of the Order of the Crown of Italy.

== Works ==
- La pyramide à degrés, I et II, l'architecture, Fouilles à Saqqarah, Service des antiquités de l'Égypte, Le Caire, 1936.
- La pyramide à degrés, III, compléments, Fouilles à Saqqarah, Service des antiquités de l'Égypte, Le Caire, 1939.
- Le temple funéraire de Khéops à la grande pyramide de Guizèh, n°46, ASAE, Le Caire, 1947.
- Études complémentaires sur les monuments du roi Djoser à Saqqarah, cahier 9, Supplément, ASAE, Le Caire, 1948.
- Le problème des pyramides d'Égypte, traditions et légendes, Bibliothèque historique, Payot, Paris, 1948.
- Note complémentaire sur le temple funéraire de Khéops, n°49, ASAE, Le Caire, 1949.
- In collaboration with Ch. Picard, Les statues ptolémaïques du Sarapieion de Memphis, n°3, Publications d'art et d'archéologie de l'université de Paris, PUF, Paris, 1955.
- Le temple haut de la pyramide du roi Ouserkaf à Saqqarah, n°53, ASAE, Le Caire, 1956.
- In collaboration with Pierre Lacau, Fouilles à Saqqarah. La pyramide à degrés, IV, Inscriptions gravées sur les vases, 2 fasc., PIFAO, Le Caire, 1959.
- Observations sur les pyramides, Bibliothèque d'étude, n°30, IFAO, Le Caire, 1960.
- Histoire monumentale des pyramides d'Égypte, I, Les pyramides à degrés (IIIe dynastie égyptienne), n°39, BdE, IFAO, Le Caire, 1962.
- In collaboration with Pierre Lacau, Fouilles à Saqqarah. La pyramide à degrés, V, Inscriptions à l'encre sur les vases, PIFAO, Le Caire, 1965.
- Sur la pyramide de Meïdoum et les deux pyramides du roi Snéfrou à Dahshour, n°36, Orientalia, Rome, 1967.
- Raison première et utilisation pratique de la grande galerie, dans la pyramide de Khéops, n°12, Beiträge Bf, Festschrift ricke, Wiesbaden, 1971.
- In collaboration with Jean Leclant, Mission archéologique de Saqqarah, I, le temple haut du complexe funéraire du roi Téti, bibliothèque d'étude, n°51, IFAO, Le Caire, 1972.
- Remarques sur la planification de la construction de la grande pyramide, à propos de : The investment process organization of the Cheops pyramids, with W.Kozinnnski, n°73, BIFAO, Le Caire, 1973.
- Le Mystère des Pyramides, éd. des Presses de la Cité, Paris, 1974, ISBN 2-258-02368-8
- Nouvelles recherches à la pyramide de Mérenrê, n°53 et n°54, BIE, Le Caire, 1974.
- In collaboration with Audran Labrousse and Jean Leclant, Mission archéologique de Saqqarah. II, Le temple haut du complexe funéraire du roi Ounas, n°73, BdE, IFAO, Le Caire, 1977.
- Les pyramides de Saqqarah, bibliothèque générale, IFAO, Le Caire, 5e éd. 1977.
- In collaboration with A. Shoucair, Saqqarah, la nécropole royale de Memphis, quarante siècles d'histoire, cent vingt-cinq ans de recherches, Tallandier, Paris, 1977.
- In collaboration with Cyril Aldred, J.L. Cenival, F. Debono, Christiane Desroches Noblecourt, Jean Leclant and Jean Vercoutter, Le temps des pyramides, L'univers des formes, Gallimard, Paris, 1978.
- À propos de l'invention de la pierre de taille par Imhotep pour la demeure d'éternité du roi Djoser, MGEM, IFAO, Le Caire, 1985.
- Remarques sur l'époque possible du viol de la tombe de Khéops dans la Grande Pyramide, pp. 385–386, The Intellectual Heritage of Egypt, Ulrich Luft, Budapest, 1992.
- In collaboration with Jean Leclant and Audran Labrousse, L'architecture des pyramides à textes, I, Saqqarah Nord, 2 vol., n°114, BdE, IFAO, Le Caire, 1996.
- In collaboration with Audran Labrousse, Les complexes funéraires d'Ouserkaf et de Néferhétepès, n°130, 2 vol., BdE, IFAO, Le Caire, 2000.
- Saqqarah, une vie, Payot, 2009
- Excavations at Saqqara : The Step pyramid / by Cecil M. Firth and J.E. Quibell, with plans by J.-P. Lauer .
- Cinquante années à Saqqarah de Jean-Philippe Lauer, architecte, archéologue : exposition organis / (text by Catherine Berger).
