= Hesy-Ra =

Ancient Egyptian dentist

- Confidant of the king
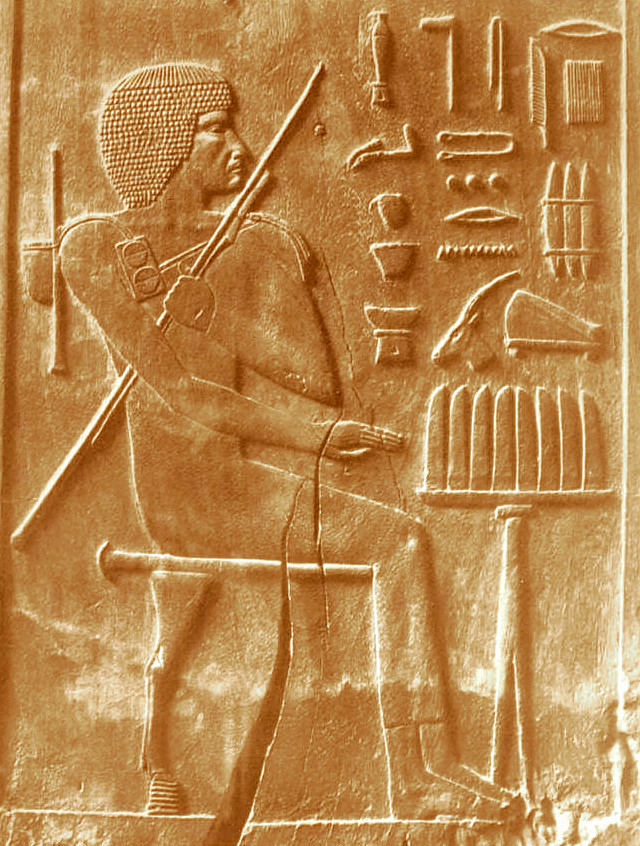
- Cedar wood panel depicting Hesy-Ra.
Egyptian name
D21 D36 V28 W14 O34 M17 M17 rʳ-ḥsj
Blessed by Ra

Hesire (also read Hesy-Re and Hesy-Ra) was an ancient Egyptian high official during the early Third Dynasty of Egypt. His most notable title was Wer-ibeḥsenjw, meaning either "Great one of the ivory cutters" or "Great one of the dentists", which makes him the earliest named dentist. His tomb is noted for its paintings and cedar wood panels.

== Identity ==
Thanks to several clay seal impressions found in Hesire's tomb, it is today known that this high official lived and worked during the reign of king (pharaoh) Djoser and maybe also under king Sekhemkhet.

Hesire's name is of some interest to Egyptologists and historians alike, because it is linked to the sun god Ra. Hesy-Ra, alongside a few high officials at this time, belongs to the first high officials who were allowed to link their names to Ra. However, they were not allowed to use the sun disk hieroglyph to write Ra's name. This was permitted to the king only.

=== Titles ===
As a high-ranking official and priest, Hesire bore several elite and pious titularies:

- Confidant of the king (Egyptian: Rekh-neswt).
- Great one of the "ten of Upper Egypt" (Egyptian: Wer-medi-shemaw).
- Great one of Peh (Egyptian: Wer-Peh).
- Great one of the dentists (Egyptian: Wer-ibeḥ-senjw).
- Elder of the "Qed-hetep" (Egyptian: Semsw-qed-hetep).
- Chief of the scribes (Egyptian: Medjeh-seschjw).
- Brother of Min (Egyptian: Sen-Min).
- Magician of Mehit (Egyptian: Hem-ḥeka-Meḥit).

The most debated title amongst Hesire's many rather unique titles is Wer-ibeḥ-senjw, which can be translated in many ways: ibeh can be translated as either "dentition" or "ivory", and Senjw as "arrows", "cutters" and/or "physicians"; thus, the full title Wer-ibeḥ-senjw can either be translated as "Great one of the ivory cutters" or as "Great one of the dentists". If the former translation is correct, Hesy-Ra was a professional ivory-cutter and artist - a profession that was fairly common and already attested in early dynastic inscriptions. If the latter translation is correct, Hesy-Ra would be the first person in Egyptian history to be officially entitled as an occupational dentist.

Hesire also draws interest because of the richly decorated cedar wood panels and the colorful wall paintings discovered inside and outside his tomb.

On the richly decorated cedar wood panels, Hesy-Ra is depicted in different stages of his life: close to the entrance he is shown as a young man at the start of his career; going deeper inside the tomb, as a middle-aged man at the heyday of his career; and finally, in the remembrance chapel itself, as an old man, sitting on an offering table and being stuffed in a tight gown. The artist of the panels even accentuated the visible aspects of age: Hesy-Ra's face changes from pretty smooth to wrinkled and saggy.

The portraits of Hesire from different stages of age

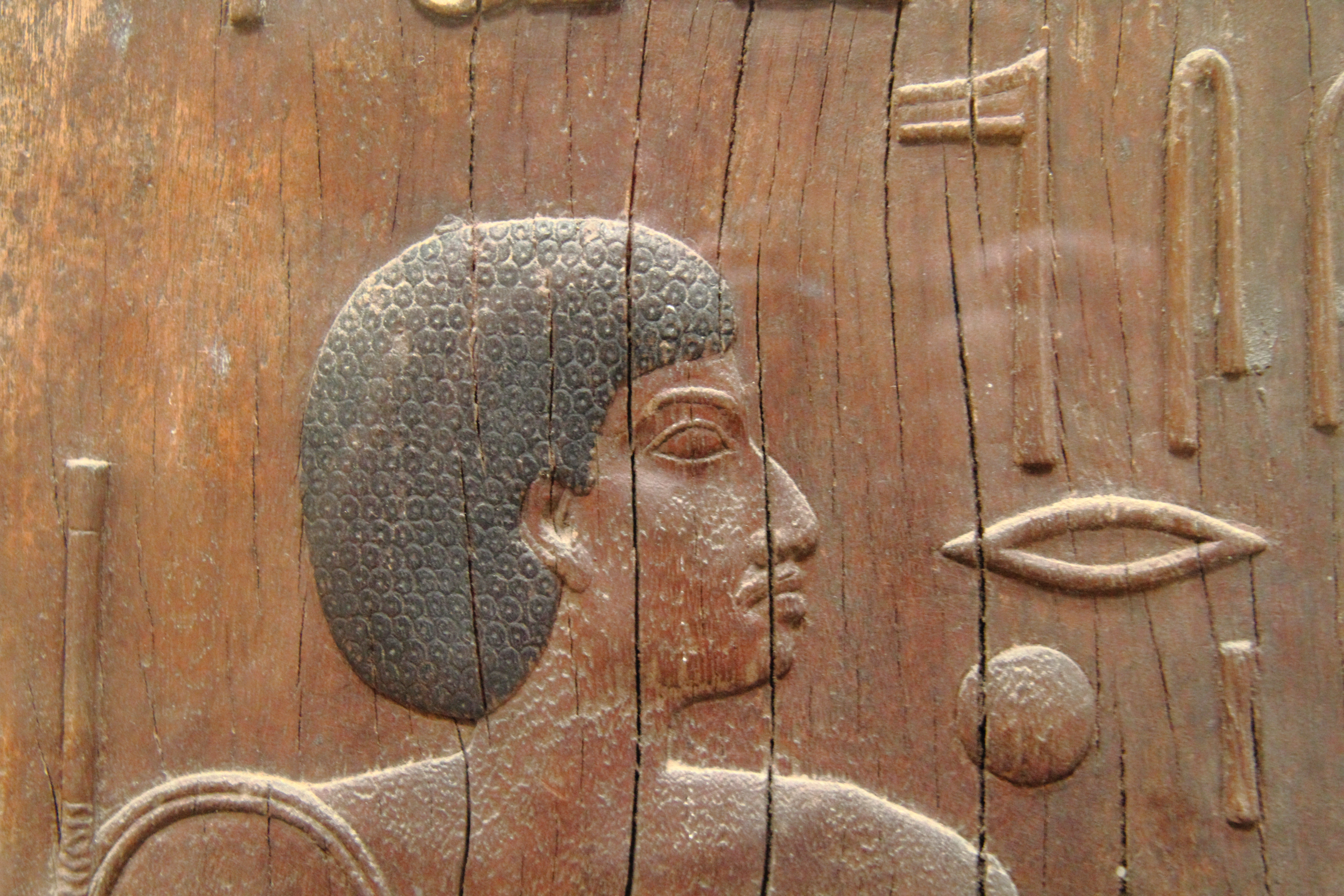

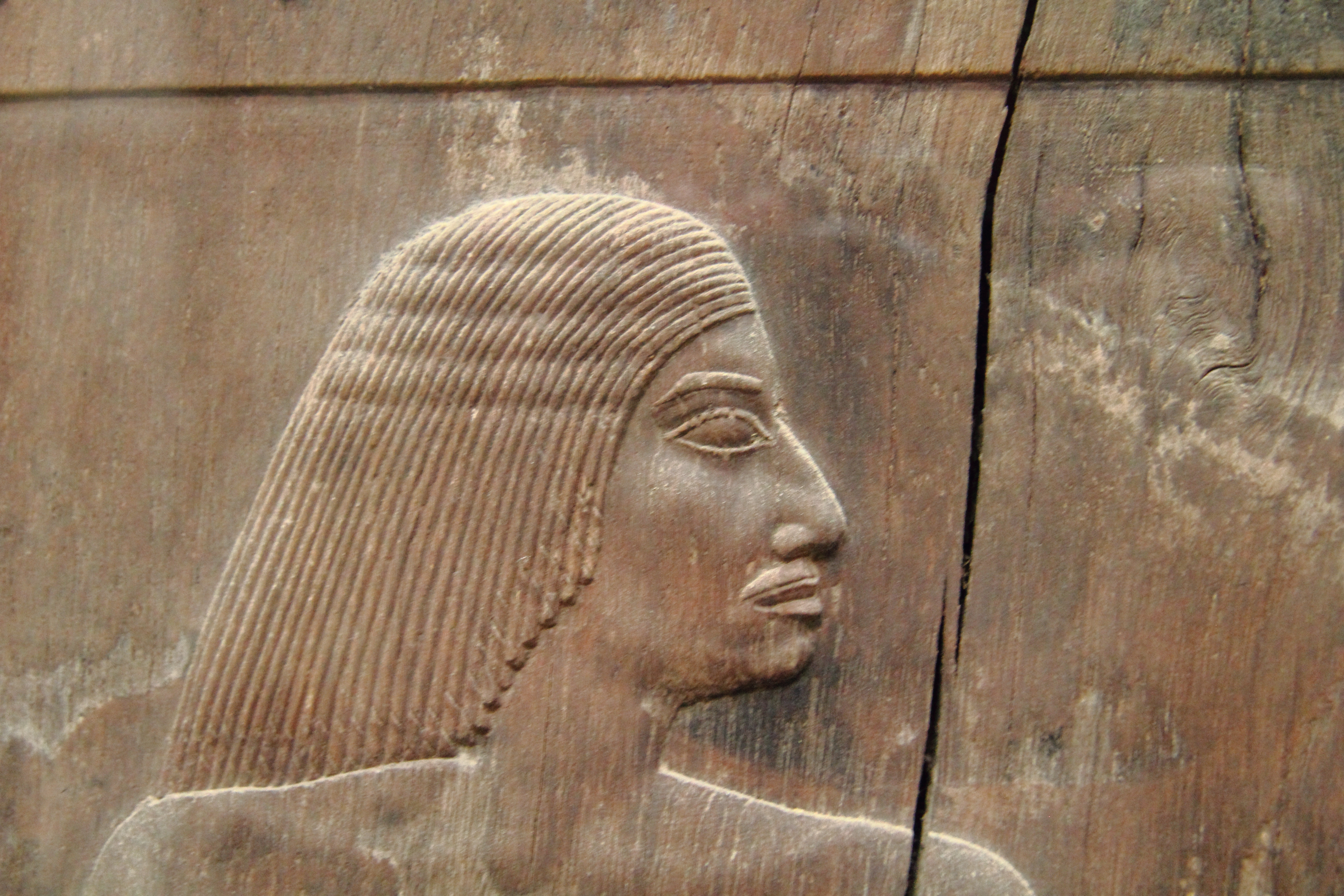

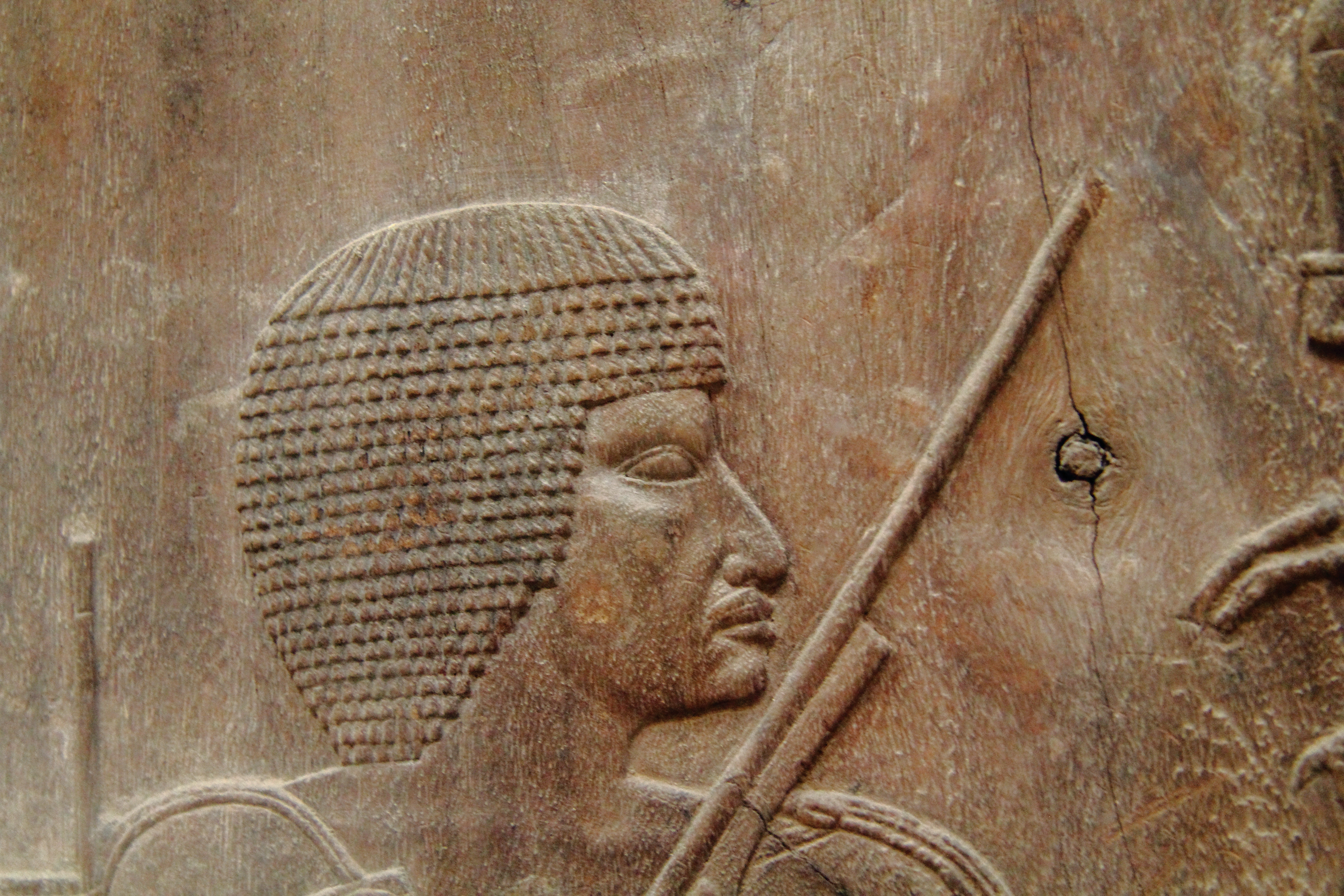

The wall paintings discovered inside and outside his tomb are in black, white, yellow, green and red. The figures include rhomboids, stripes and a green-yellowish reed mat imitation. The paintings were in such a good state when found, that the excavators decided to fill the painted corridors with high quality rubble in attempt to preserve the colors. Close-by reliefs reportedly depict daily utensils and even game accessories, such as Mehen game boards and a Senet play set.

Possible contemporary office partners included Netjeraperef, Akhetaa, Khabawsokar, Pehernefer and Metjen, who were also holding office under Huni and Sneferu. All their tomb inscriptions reveal that the time of both kings must have been a very prosperous one, as both economy and office administration flourished.

== Tomb ==
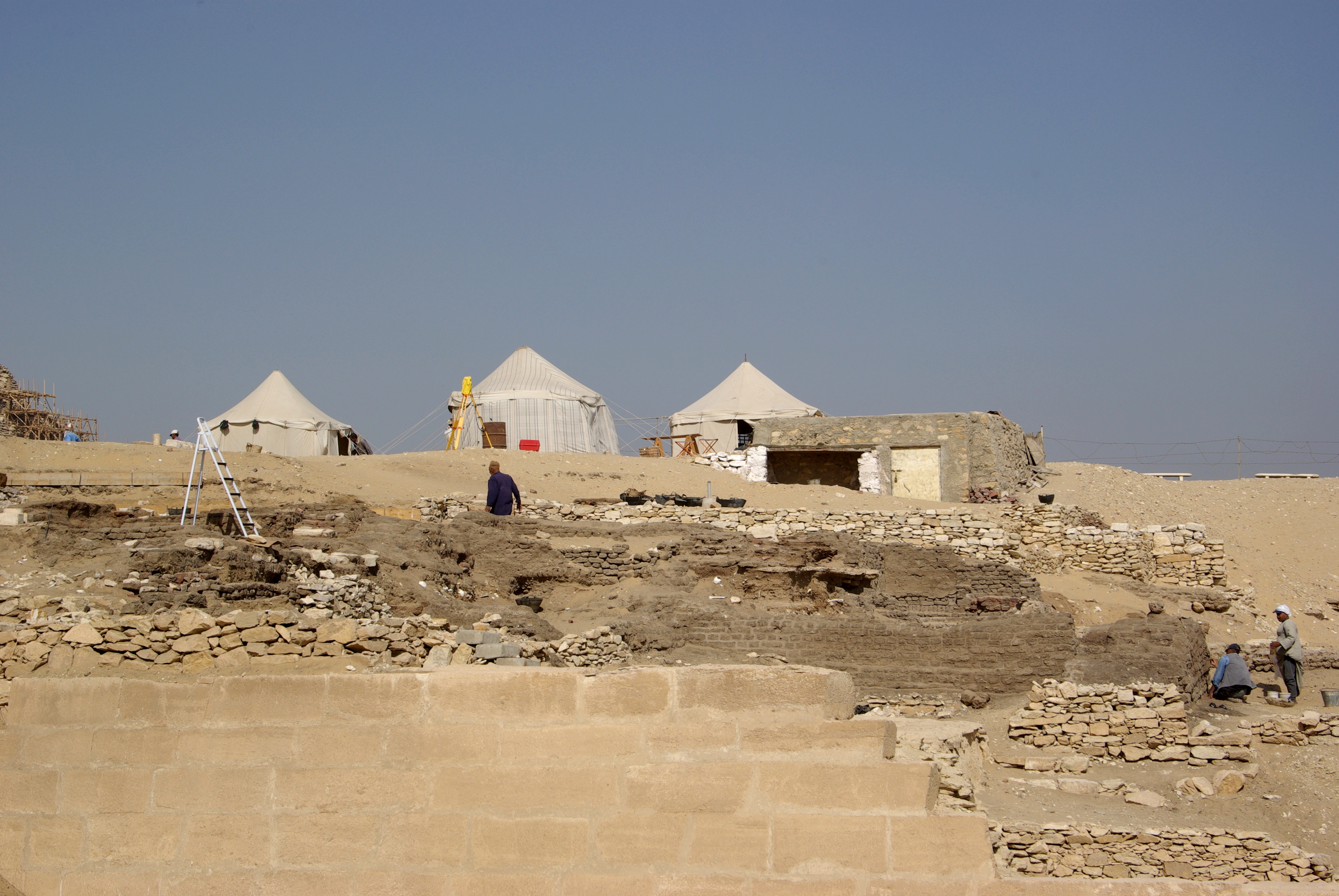
Archaeological excavation at the Mastaba of Hesy-Ra in November 2010

Hesire's tomb, mastaba S-2405, is situated in Saqqara; it was discovered in 1861 by French archaeologists Auguste Mariette and Jacques de Morgan. Excavations started in 1910 and ended in 1912, organized and performed by British archaeologist James Edward Quibell. Hesire's tomb is squeezed in between dozens of others, approximately 260 m north-east of king Djoser's pyramid complex. In its original state, the mastaba was 43 m long, 22 m wide and 5 m high. It was made of hardened mud bricks. Inner and outer walls were once completely and smoothly covered with white limestone. The inner room structure consisted of a long, niched corridor and several rooms and chapels.

== See also ==
- List of ancient Egyptian scribes
