= Akhty =

Akhty may refer to:

- Akhty, Republic of Dagestan, a rural locality in Akhtynsky District, Russia
- Akhty (deity) or Netjer-akhty, an ancient Egyptian god
