= Pehenuikai =

Ancient Egyptian official

- Vizier of Egypt
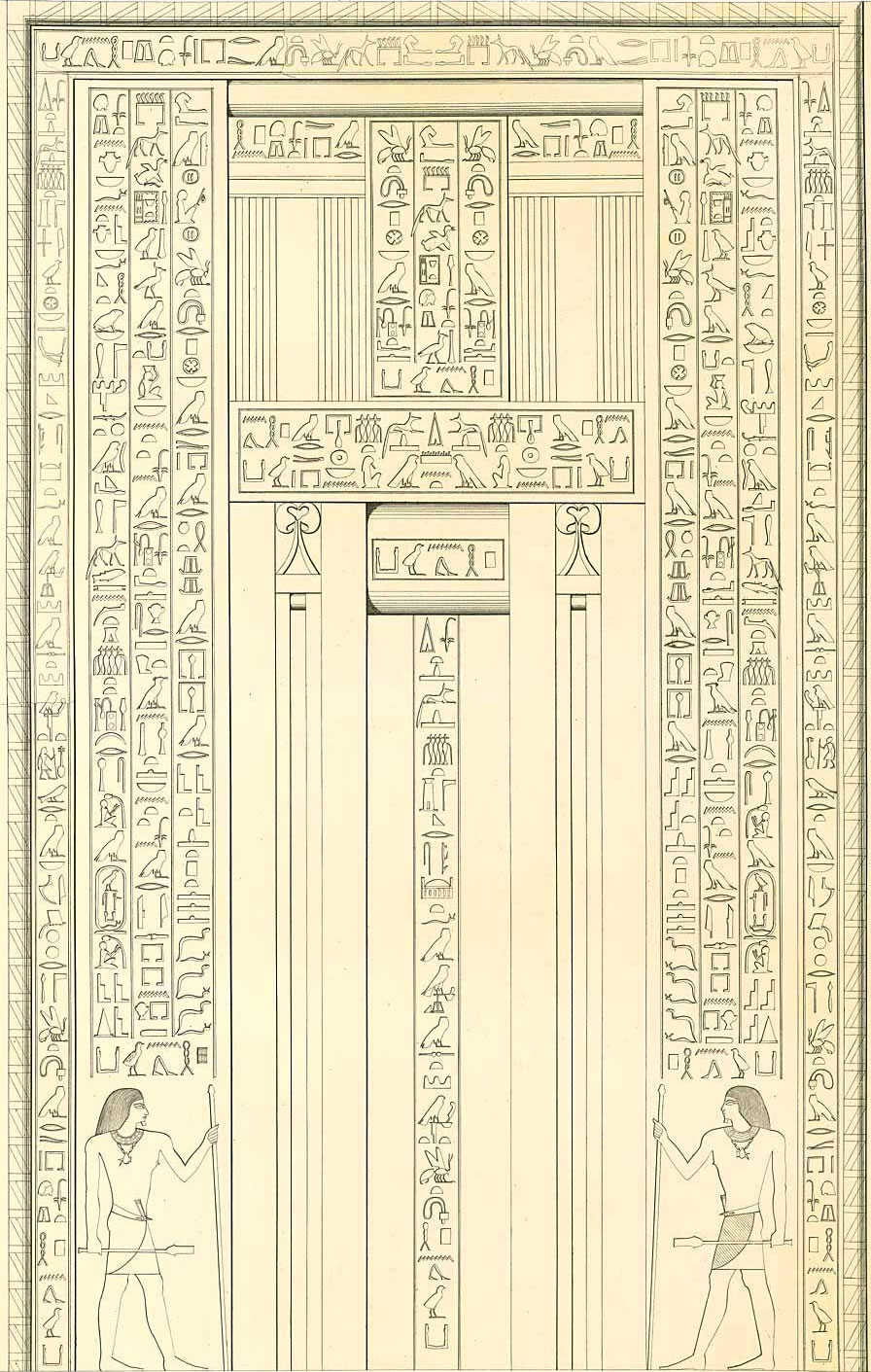
- False door of Pehenuikai
- Tenure: c. 2450 BC
- Burial: Mastaba D70, Saqqara, Egypt
- Spouse: Hetepheres
- Children: Iti

Pehenuikai (fl. c. 2450 BC) was an Ancient Egyptian official of the Fifth Dynasty. His main office was that of a vizier, making him to the most important man at the royal court, only second to the king. Beside being vizier, he was also holding many other important titles, such as Overseer of the treasuries, overseer of the scribes of the king's document, overseer of the double granary and overseer of all royal works of the king.

Pehenuikai is mainly known from his mastaba at Saqqara, one of the largest mastabas at this site (Mariette number D 70). It is located not far from the mastaba of Seshemu and Metjen Big parts of the mastaba's decoration were copied and published by the expedition of Karl Richard Lepsius (Lepsius tomb 15). In the tomb is also depicted Pehenuikai's family. His wife was called Hetepheres, one son was called Iti.

The exact dating of Pehenuikai is uncertain. A certain Shepsi who had a mastaba nearby, was most likely his father. The latter dates perhaps under king Sahure. Pehenuikai must date one generation later, probably under king Nyuserre Ini.

== Literature ==
- Mariette, Auguste; Maspero, Gaston (1889). Les mastabas de l'Ancien Empire: Fragment du dernier ouvrage de A. Mariette, publié d'après le manuscrit de l'auteur. Paris. OCLC 46226552.
- Strudwick, Nigel (1985). The Administration of Egypt in the Old Kingdom: The Highest Titles and Their Holders (PDF). Studies in Egyptology. London; Boston: Kegan Paul International. ISBN 978-0-7103-0107-9. Archived from the original (PDF) on 2014-04-03.
