= Seshemu =

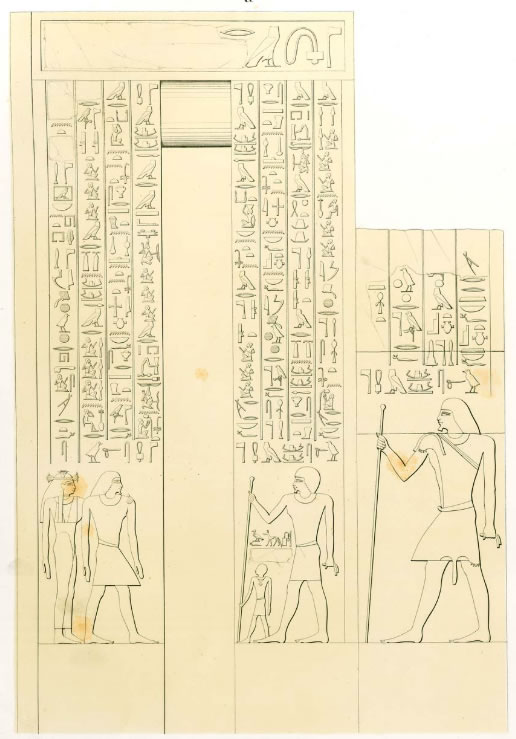
Falsedoor of Seshemu

Seshemu was a high-ranking ancient Egyptian dignitary known from his mastaba in Saqqara. He lived during the 5th Dynasty. . Seshemu held various titles that signify his high rank. Among his numerous titles were overseer of the souble granary and overseer of all the King's works. Seshemu is the earliest known holder of the title overseer of the double granary, the highest position within the barn administration. Several titles indicate that he led expeditions. He was, for example, God's Sealer (a typical expedition title) and Commander of the Troop.

The mastaba of Seshemu was discovered by the Karl Richard Lepsius Expedition.] It is located not far from the mastabas of Metjen and Pehenuikai. Its chapel consists of an entrance and a chamber containing the false door, which is the only decorated part of the tomb. Next to the cult chamber is a serdab.

The inscribed false door came to the Egyptian Museum in Berlin (inventory number 1110). Here, his wife Merites, who was a priestess of Hathor, is mentioned.
