= Akhetaa =

- Confidant of the king
Egyptian name
G25 t O29 D36 G13ḫtj-ʳ3
The greatest one of Akhty

Akhetaa (also written Achtiaa and Aa-Akhti) was an ancient Egyptian high official during the mid to late 3rd Dynasty (Old Kingdom period). He is mostly known for his tomb inscriptions, which refer to various seldom used titles as well as to the shadowy king Nebka, in whose cult Akhetaa served.

== Identity ==
=== Family ===
Akhetaa was married to the confidant of the king, Meretenes. This lady is possibly the first of the Old Kingdom who was honoured with the female version of the aristocratic title "confidant of the king".

=== Titles ===
As a high-ranking official and priest, Akhetaa bore several elite and pious titularies:

- Confidant of the king (Egyptian: Rekh-neswt).
- Companion of the royal house (Egyptian: Semer-per-nesw).
- Great one of the 'ten of Upper Egypt (Egyptian: Wer-medj-shemaw).
- Privy to all secrets and affairs of the king (Egyptian: Herj-seshet-neb-hety-nebef-en-nesw).
- Director of the food menu (Egyptian: Kherep-seh).
- Director of the twin basins of the royal house (Egyptian: Kherep-merwy-perwer).
- Promoter of Kenmut (Egyptian: Jwn-kenmwt).
- God's servant of Akhty (Egyptian: Hem-netjer-Akhty).
- God's servant in the temple of king Nebka (Egyptian: Hem-netjer-hwt-netjer-Nebka).
- Leader of the priests under the Red Crown of ?Upper Egypt? (Egyptian: Sekhem-hemw-deshret).

=== Career ===
Akhetaa's tomb inscription is of the highest interest to Egyptologists and historians alike. It provides unique titles such as "Director of the twin basins of the royal house" and rare titles such as "Promoter of Kenmut". The first one is disputed, because scholars do not know if the designation "twin basin" has to be taken verbatim or if it points to sacred lakes representing Lower and Upper Egypt. The other title, "Promoter of Kenmut", points to a priestly role as the bearer of the king's sacred panther fur. In later times, from the 5th Dynasty onward, a deity named Kenmut is known and can be found depicted in the solar sanctuary of pharaoh Pepi I. However it remains uncertain whether this god is identical to the "Kenmut" mentioned in Akhetaa's tomb inscription.

Another subject of interest is Akhetaa's title "God's servant in the temple of king Nebka". Nebka's name appears in a royal cartouche, a practice that is otherwise only known from the reign of king Huni onwards. Thus, it is possible that Akhetaa worked under this king or slightly earlier. It is unclear whether Akhetaa served a priestly role in the cult of a living king or in a funerary cult, a precision that would determine Nebka's uncertain chronology as an early or late third Dynasty king. Unfortunately, Akhetaa's inscriptions mention no further kings. However, only a part of the whole tomb reliefs is preserved today, which leaves the possibility open that indeed other kings were once mentioned.

Possible contemporary office partners included Netjeraperef, Hesyre, Khabawsokar, Pehernefer and Metjen, who were also holding office under Huni and Sneferu. All their tomb inscriptions reveal that the time of both kings must have been a very prosperous one and the economy and office administration flourished.

== Tomb ==
The exact geographical location of Akhetaa's mastaba tomb is unknown. It is believed, however, that it was once located at Abusir, as some relief blocks were found re-used in the town. The current status of the tomb is labelled as "missing".
