= Netjeraperef =

Ancient Egyptian civil servant

Netjeraperef in hieroglyphs
Personal name:
R8 Aa20 a p r f
Netjer-aperef
nṯr-ʳpr-f
He who works for a god
Honorary title A:
M23 X1 G39
Sa-neswt
s3-nsw.t
Son of the king

Netjeraperef is the name of an ancient Egyptian high official and prince. He lived and worked at the transition time between 3rd and 4th Dynasty during the Old Kingdom period.

== Identity ==
=== Family ===
Netjeraperef was most possibly a son of king (pharaoh) Sneferu. However, this suggestion is disputed, because the elite title "son of the king" was often merely an honorary title during the Old Kingdom, given to rightful officials of extraordinary ranks. "Real" princes bore the title "bodily son of the king".

=== Titles ===
As a high-ranking official and priest, Netjeraperef held many bureaucratic and priestly titles:

- Son of the King (Egyptian: Sa-nesw).
- Overseer of the phyles of Lower Egypt (Egyptian: Imy-ra-zau-Shemaw).
- Overseer of the commissioners (Egyptian: Imy-ra-wpwt).
- Chief of the nomes (Egyptian: Heqa-sepawt).
- God's servant of the pyramid Snefru, the blessed, appears (Egyptian: Hem-netjer-Kha-khenty-Snefru).

=== Career ===
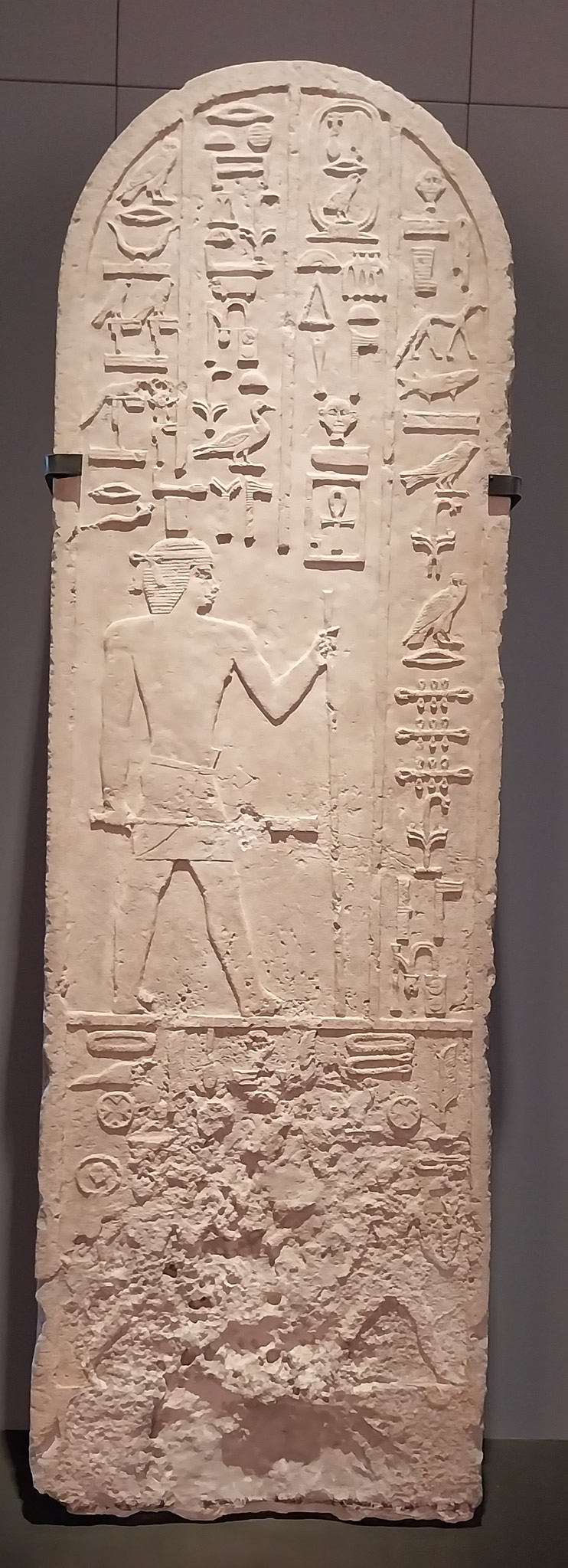
Stela of Netjeraperef, found at Dahshur

It is noteworthy to mention, that the first three titles Imy-ra-shemaw, Imy-ra-wpwt and Heqa-sepawt are common titles for officials of Lower Egypt. Thus, Netjeraperef held office in northern territories.

Possible contemporary office partners of Netjeraperef may have been Khabawsokar, Metjen, Pehernefer and Akhetaa. These are likewise known for their unusually richly decorated tomb chapels and for their accurately reported careers. However, it is not proven that these officials were related to each other in any way.

== Tomb ==
Netjeraperef was buried in mastaba I/1 at Dahshur, which was excavated by the German Archaeological Institute, Cairo. The tomb was made of mudbricks and measured once around 35.10m x 18.90m. The inner structure comprised a stairway with a few steps leading into a straight corridor. The corridor in turn led into a hallway stretching left and right, forming a T-shaped chamber arrangement. It is noteworthy to mention that the terrain of Dahshur provided a rather soft and loose ground, a circumstance that forbade any deeper underground chamber building and thus forced the tomb builders to create chambers inside the mastaba and over ground level. A similar case happened during the construction of the Bent Pyramid, when the walls and ceilings of chambers under ground level started to form cracks. At the central chamber of Netjeraperef's tomb, an altar was placed in an offering chapel. A special feature of Netjeraperef's offering chapel are the two stelae (once set each left and right of the altar), of which one is nearly completely preserved. This arrangement was a clear copy of Sneferu's stele sanctuaries at his pyramids at Meidum and Dahshur. The stelae both once bore the names and titles of Netjeraperef. One of the stelae, however, was stolen during restoration work in Middle Kingdom period and re-used as a door frame for Sneferu's valley temple at Meidum.
