= Mehen =

Ancient Egyptian deity

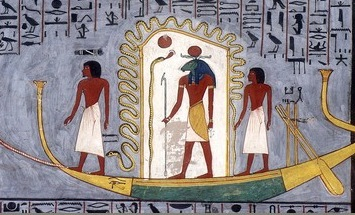
- Mehen surrounding Ra, in the form of a man with a ram head, on his Solar Barque
Name in hieroglyphs
mH n I12

In Egyptian mythology, the name Mehen (Coptic: Ⲙⲉϩⲉⲛ), meaning 'coiled one', referred to a mythological snake-god and to a board game.

== Snake god ==
The earliest known references to Mehen occur in the Coffin Texts. Mehen is a protective deity who is depicted as a snake which coils around the sun god Ra during his journey through the night, for instance in the Amduat.

In the German-Egyptian dictionary by R. Hannig, it is said that the Mehen (mḥn) or the Mehenet (mḥnt) snake is equivalent to the Ouroboros.

== Relationship between snake-god and Mehen game ==
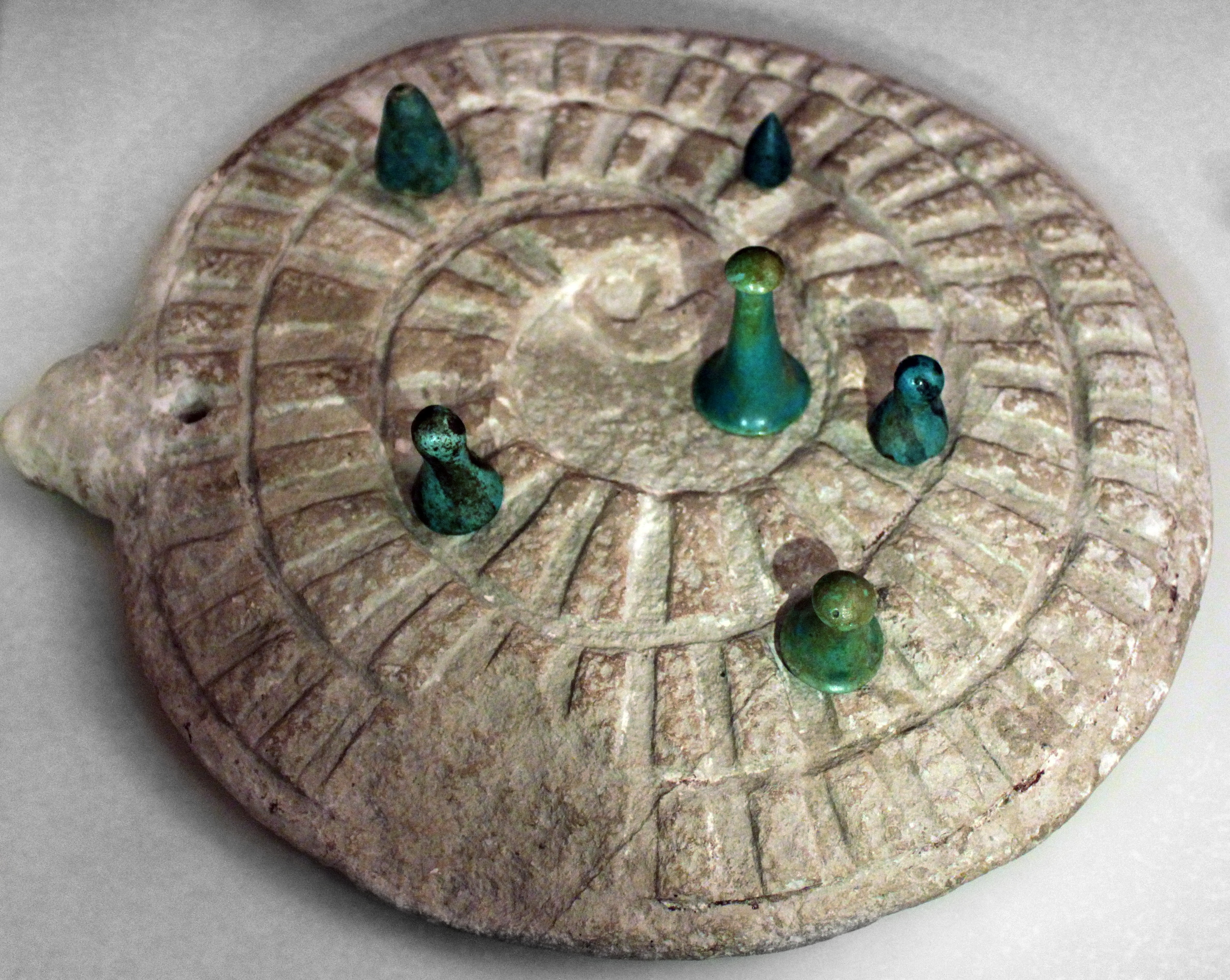
Mehen with game stones, from Abydos, Egypt, 3000 BC, Neues Museum

The precise relationship between the deity and the Mehen game is unknown. For instance, it is unknown whether the game derives from the mythological character or the character derives from the game.

It is known that the object known as mehen depicts a game rather than a religious fetish as demonstrated in tomb paintings, game boards, and equipment. The rules and method of playing the game are unknown, although rules have been created in modern times based on assessments of how it may have been played.
