= Statue of Metjen =

Ancient Egyptian statue

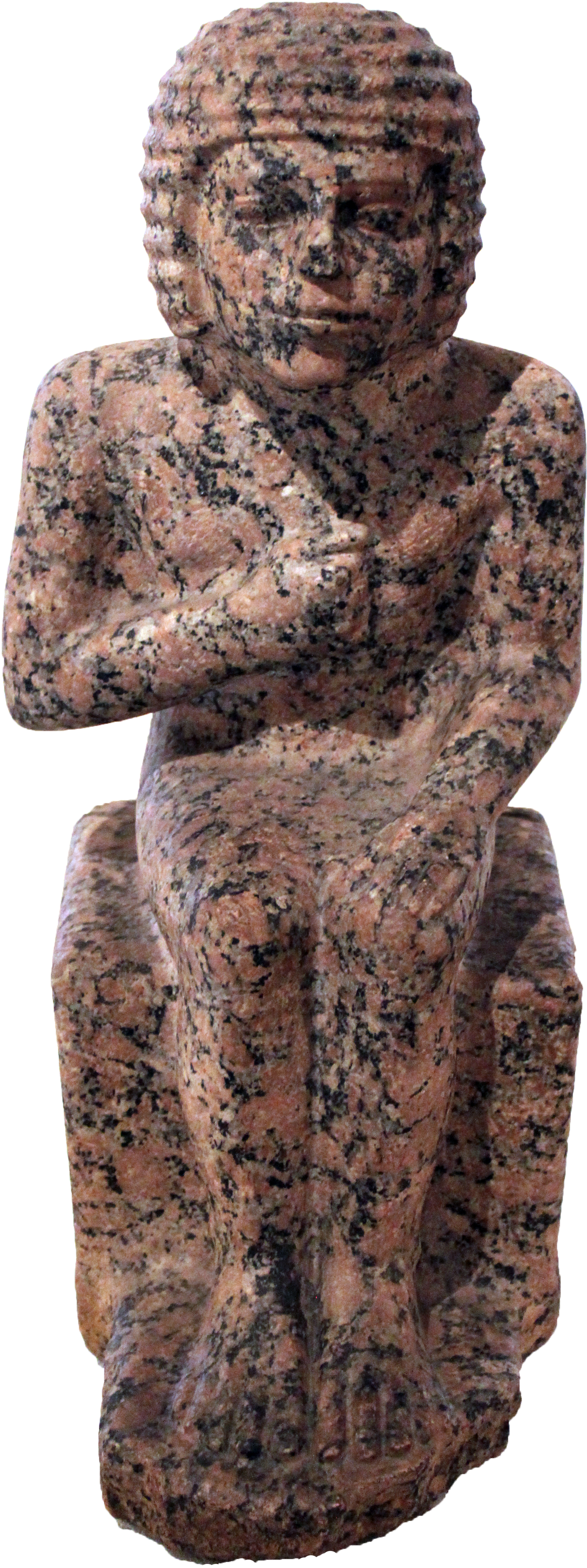
- Statue of Metjen
- Catalogue: ÄM 1106
- Medium: Granite
- Subject: Metjen
- Dimensions: 47 cm (19 in)
- Location: Egyptian Museum in Berlin, Berlin

The Statue of Metjen is on display in the Egyptian Museum in Berlin and has the inventory number ÄM 1106. The statue was discovered at Abusir in Metjen's mastaba by the Egyptian expedition (1842–1845) under the direction of the Prussian scholar Karl Richard Lepsius. The statue and the mastaba were bought to the museum in Berlin. The statue is an early example of an Egyptian statue belonging to a private individual. Metjen lived at the end of the Third Dynasty and the beginning of the Fourth Dynasty (around 2600 BC). The statue is made of granite and about 47 cm (19 in) high. It is datable under king Snofru.

Metjen is shown sitting on a chair. His right hand forms a fist and is placed on the chest, the left hand is placed on the leg. Metjen wears short curly hair. On the sides of the chair are inscriptions providing Metjen's name and his titles. The statue was once placed in the serdab of the mastaba and was therefore only visible via a small hole in the wall.

The statue belongs to the small group of private statues datable to the Egyptian Third Dynasty and earliest Fourth Dynasty. They are all made of hard stone and appear somehow clumsy and heavy. The statue of Metjen is the latest one of them. The statue belongs therefore stylistically between those of the Third Dynasty and those of the Fourth Dynasty. Its head is slightly too large, the small dimensions and the hieroglyphic texts in raised relief connects the statue with the Third Dynasty. Typical for the Fourth Dynasty are the positions of the hands and the chair, that does no longer copies a real chair as in the Third Dynasty.
