= Mehen (game) =

Ancient Egyptian board game

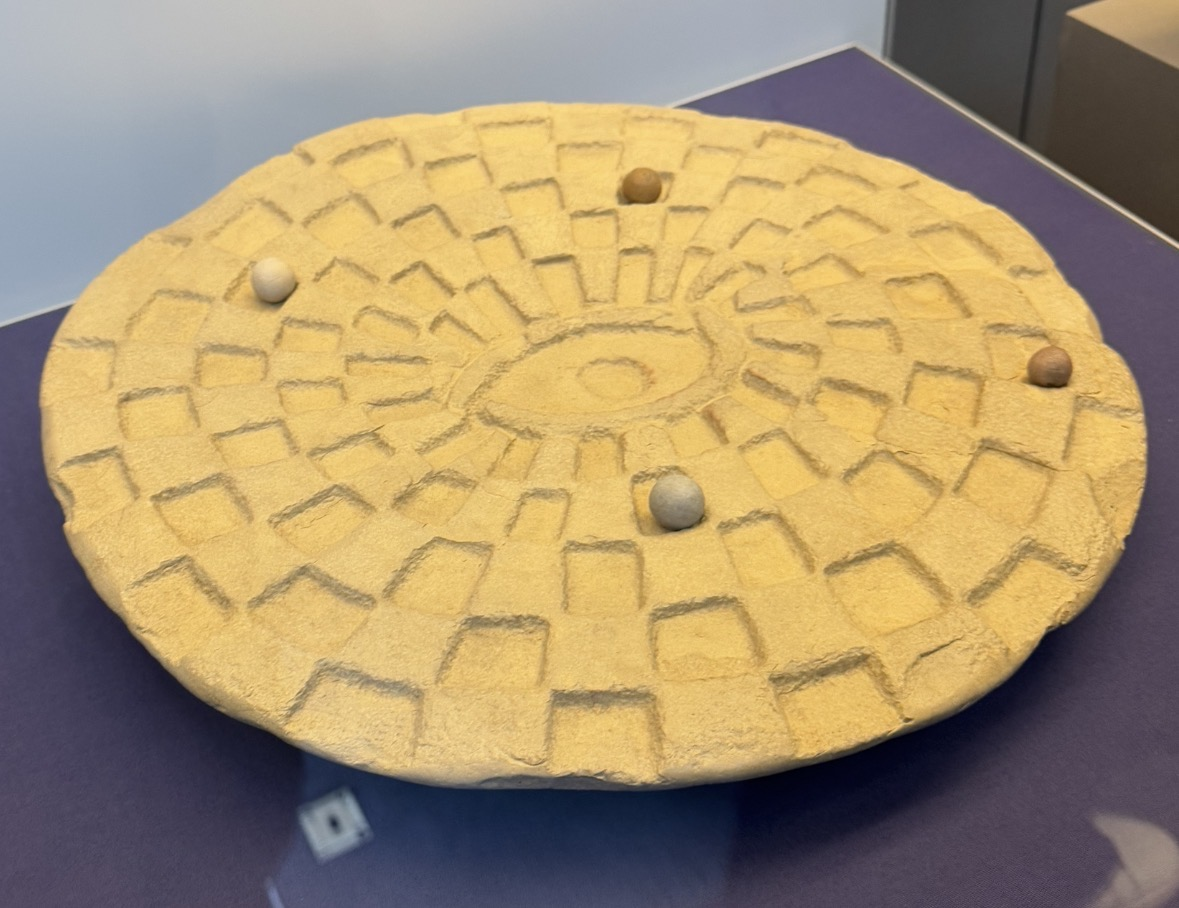
- Mehen board and pieces from Egypt, date uncertain, now in the British Museum.
- Years active: dating from approximately 3000 BC and continues until the end of the Old Kingdom, around 2300 BC
- Genres: Board game
- Players: unknown
- Playing time: unknown

Mehen in hieroglyphs
V22 N35 I12
mḥn

Mehen is a board game which was played in ancient Egypt. The game was named in reference to Mehen, a snake deity in ancient Egyptian religion.

== History ==
Evidence of the game of Mehen is found from the Predynastic period dating from approximately 3000 BC and continues until the end of the Old Kingdom, around 2300 BC. Aside from physical boards, which mostly date to the Predynastic and Archaic periods, a Mehen board also appears in a picture in the tomb of Hesy-Ra, and its name first appears in the tomb of Rahotep. Other scenes dating to the Fifth Dynasty of Egypt and Sixth Dynasty of Egypt show people playing the game. No scenes or boards date to the Middle Kingdom of Egypt or the New Kingdom of Egypt, and so it appears that the game was no longer played in Egypt after the Old Kingdom. It is, however, depicted in two tombs circa 700 BC, because the tomb decorations are copied from Old Kingdom originals.

Mehen also appears to have been played outside of Egypt. It appears alongside other boards displaying the game of senet at Bab 'edh Dhra and in Cyprus. In Cyprus, it sometimes appears on the opposite side of the same stone as senet, and those from Sotira Kaminoudhia, dating to approximately 2250 BC, are the oldest surviving double-sided boards known. Mehen survived in Cyprus longer than in Egypt, showing that the game was indigenized upon its adoption into the island's culture.

Helène Whittaker has suggested that it is likely that Mehen was played on Crete as well as Cyprus, and that the Phaistos Disc may be a miniaturised version of a Mehen gameboard.

== Equipment ==
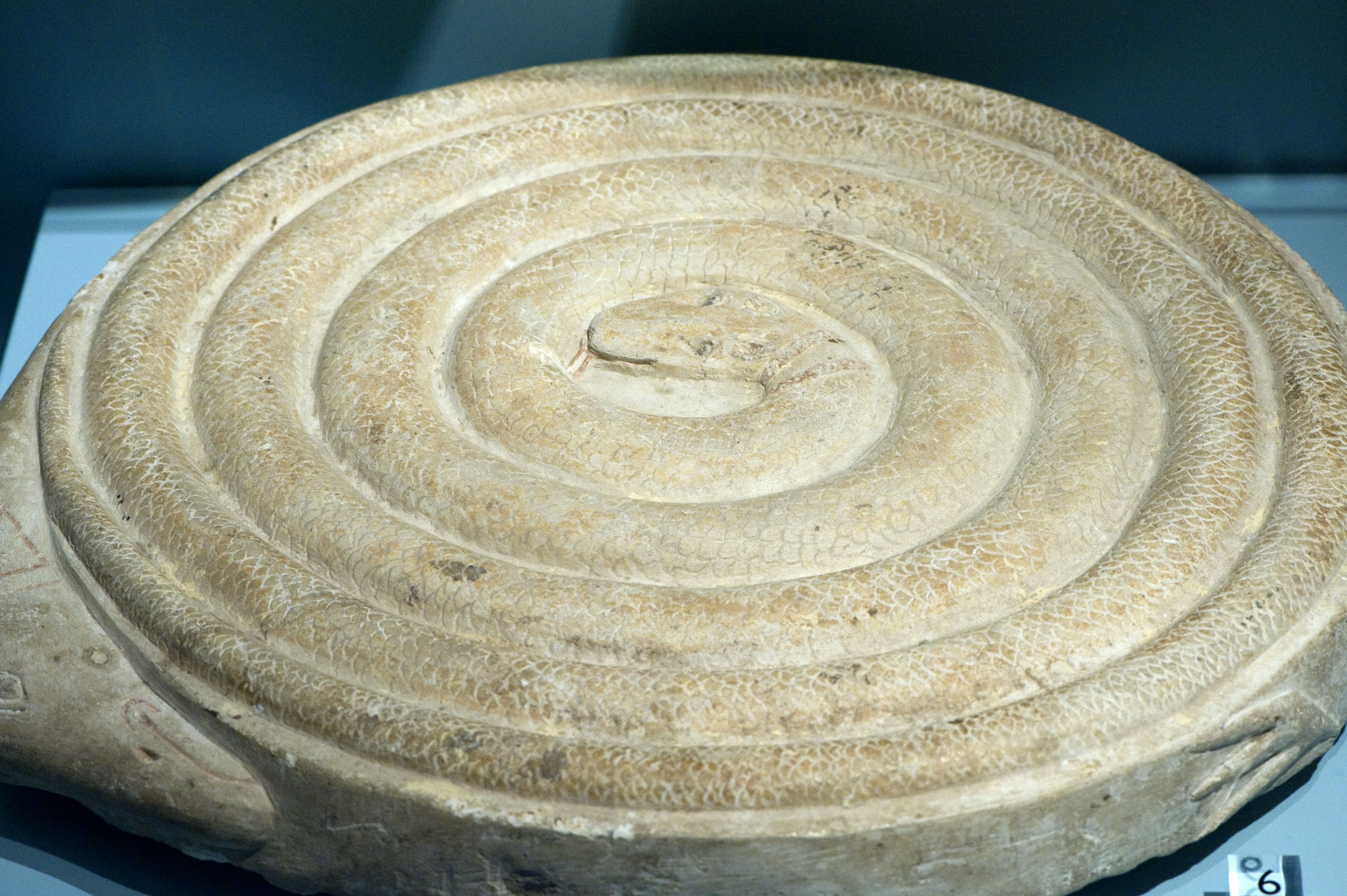
One example of Mehen

In Egypt, the gameboard depicts a coiled snake whose body is divided into rectangular spaces. Eight such boards and some fragments have been found with different numbers of playing spaces. Boards depicted in the tomb of Hesy-Ra and on the Causeway of Sahure are also segmented. The board held at the Fitzwilliam Museum in Cambridge is unique in that a few of the playing spaces are hatched. Boards shown on tomb walls usually have a large trapezium appendage protruding from their edge, whereas three stone boards from the archaeological record feature an animal head protrusion and two other gameboards are encircled with a goose or duck figure. Finds of lion and lioness pieces are equally rare, but sets have been found in tombs from Dynasty I and are depicted on the 3rd dynasty Tomb of Hesy-Ra. Some are accompanied by sets of small marbles that are usually white but red and black marbles have also been found.

In Cyprus and the Levant, the games take the form of a spiral of depressions, sometimes with the central or outer depressions differentiated by their larger size. These also display a variable number of depressions. The variability suggests that the number of segments was of little importance to the game. Objects associated with the board may or may not be playing pieces. From archaeological evidence, the game seems to have been played with lion- or lioness-shaped pieces, in sets of three or as many as six, and a few small spheres (marbles or balls).

== Gameplay ==
The rules and gameplay of Mehen are not recorded, but it seems likely that it was a race game and the objective was to move pieces along the snake track from the tail to the head. Within Egypt, evidence for Mehen has only been found in funerary contexts, and it is likely that the game symbolized the movement of the 'Ba' or soul of the deceased person through the underworld via the body of Mehen to be reborn into the afterlife from the serpent's head, where they could be with Ra, the sun god. A study published in 2024 analyzed the possibilities for game-play in detail and showed that the mechanism for moving pieces around the board was probably "marble guessing." This works by one player putting some marbles in their fist and the other player guessing how many were hidden - the result would give the number of spaces to be moved along the snake track. The lion and lioness pieces are too big to have been moved along the playing space track and so it seems likely that marbles were also raced along the track and the lion figurines held some other function in the game.

== See also ==
- Senet
- Hyena chase, North African race game using near identical equipment

== Sources ==
- Piccione, Peter A. (1991). Mehen, Mysteries and Resurrection. pp. 43–52.
- Rothöhler, Benedikt (1997). Ägyptische Brettspiele außer Senet, unveröffentlichte MA-Thesis. Philosophische Fakultät I der Bayerischen Julius-Maximilians-Universität, Würzburg. pp. 10–23. pdf file
- Tyldesley, Joyce A. (2008). Egyptian Games and Sports (= Shire Egyptology, Band 29). Osprey Publishing. pp. 15–16. ISBN 0747806616.
- Tyldesley, Joyce A. (2010). The Penguin Book of Myths and Legends of Ancient Egypt. Penguin UK, Oxford. pp. 92–93. ISBN 014196376X.
