= Akhty (deity) =

Ancient Egyptian deity

- modern drawing of the Hieroglyph for a northern bald ibis which Akhty was associated with
Name in hieroglyphs
R8 D21 G25 Aa1 X1 or G25 Aa1 t

Akhty (also read Netjer-akhty) was an ancient Egyptian deity. He was rarely mentioned.

== Depiction ==
Akhty was depicted as a northern bald ibis. The bird depiction was often guided by the hieroglyphic sign for "god", Netjer. See a picture on the statue of the priest Redjit.

== Attestations ==
The earliest mention of this deity appears on stone vessel inscriptions from the reign of the 2nd dynasty Pharaoh Hotepsekhemwy. Egyptologists such as Wolfgang Helck believe that Akhty was a dynasty deity and ancestor god. Akhty was also depicted (and thus worshipped) under Hotepsekhemwy's successors, Raneb and Nynetjer. During the Old Kingdom period, Akhty's name only appears in connection with private names (like Akhetaa) and priest titles such as Hem-netjer-Akhty ("god's servant of Akhty"). In even later times, Akhty's names appears more and more rarely.

== Worship ==
According to ancient Egyptian mythology, the Akh-bird was believed to be the representation of the human spirit (Egyptian: Akh). Most possibly this idea was inspired by the attractive shimmering and glittering of the bird's feathers, which was compared by the Ancient Egyptians to the glittering of the stars in the night sky. A similar belief is known from Persian Bedouins, who worship the northern bald ibis as a bearer of the deceased's soul.

As Akhty's name suggests, he was believed to reside at the evening horizon, guiding the setting sun and carrying the spirit of the deceased safely into the night sky.
