= Pehernefer =

- Overseer of the treasuries
Egyptian name
F22 r F35Ph-r-nfr
At (his) end there's good

Pehernefer (also written Peher-nefer) is the personal name of an ancient Egyptian high official, who held office under the reigns of the pharaohs Huni and Sneferu, in the time between the end of 3rd Dynasty and the beginning of the 4th Dynasty during the Old Kingdom period.

== Identity ==
=== Career ===
Everything known about Pehernefer, including his high titles and his career, comes from tomb inscriptions. These reveal that he held high positions, such as:

- One of the "Great ten of Upper Egypt" (Egyptian: Wer-medj-shemaw)
- He who's under the head of the king (Egyptian: Heri-tep-nesw)
- Controller of the audience hall (Egyptian: Kherep djekh)
- Leader of the endowment estate of Meresankh I (Egyptian: Heqa-hwt-a'a-Meresankh)
- Overseer of the treasuries (Egyptian: Imi-ra per-hedj)
- Overseer of all royal works (Egyptian: Imi-ra kat-nebet net-nesw)
- Overseer of the royal granaries (Egyptian: Imj-ra schenut-nebut inet-nesu)
- Administrator of the royal palatinate "Horus the blessed star on heaven" (Egyptian: Adj-mer Hor seba-chentj-pet)
- Administrator of the western desert (Egyptian: Adj-mer semet-imentet)
- Governor of Busiris (Egyptian: Hatia Djedw)
- Seal bearer of the treasure house (Egyptian: Heri-sediawt per-hedj)

=== Family ===
Nothing is known about Pehernefer's family. Possible contemporary office partners included Netjeraperef, Khabawsokar, Metjen and Akhetaa, who were also holding office under Huni and Sneferu. All their tomb inscriptions reveal that the time of both kings must have been a very prosperous one and economy and office administration flourished. Metjen's tomb inscription actually reveals that offices were only passed down within family generations and by inheritance only.

== Tomb ==
Pehernefer's tomb is lost today. It was excavated at northern Saqqara, but was either forgotten over time or dismantled in the meanwhile. Copies of Pehernefer's tomb inscriptions were published by French archeologist Gaston Maspero in 1893 and further analyzed by Austrian Egyptologist Hermann Junker in 1939.
