= Khabawsokar =

High official in ancient Egypt

- Confidant of the king
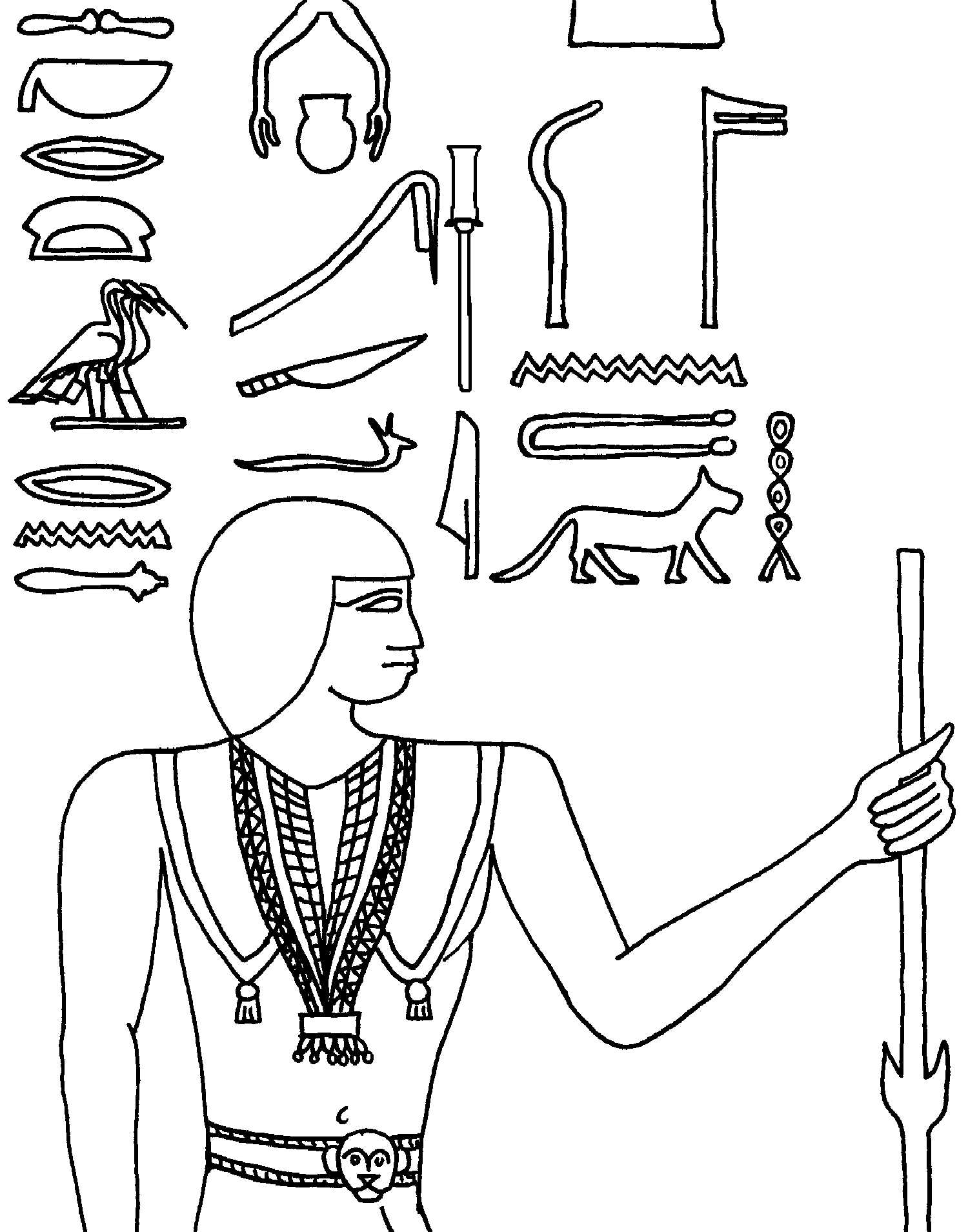
- Relief of Khabawsokar from his tomb
Egyptian name
O34 k r N28 G30 ḫʳ-b3w-skr
The souls of Sokar ashine

Khabawsokar (also read Khabawseker) was an Ancient Egyptian high official during the early to mid 3rd dynasty. He is famous for his tomb inscription and his unique nickname.

== Biography ==
=== Family ===
Khabawsokar was married to the priestess of Hathor, Hathor-neferhetepes.

=== Titles ===
As a high-ranking official and priest, Khabawsokar bore several elite and pious titularies:

- Confidant of the king (Egyptian: Rekh-neswt). A title that allowed Khabawsokar to receive audiences with the pharaoh.
- Privy councilor (Egyptian: Sa'ab).
- High priest of Anubis (Egyptian: Heqa-netjer-Inpu).
- God's servant of Sokar (Egyptian: Hem-netjer-Seker).
- God's servant of Seshat (Egyptian: Hem-netjer-Seshat).
- God's servant of Seth (Egyptian: Hem-netjer-Setekh).

=== Career ===
Khabawsokar's tomb inscriptions belong to the earliest examples of richly decorated tombs with detailed lists of bureaucratic titles, priestly offices and honorary titles. Khabawsokar had the highest number of priesthood titles in his time.

In his tomb, Khabawsokar is depicted seated in a gown, reaching out towards an offering table full of bread or cake. The jamb of a false door has two depictions of him looking away from each other. He appears as if stepping out of the door. His real name and his nickname are inscribed on both sides of the door. Khabawsokar wears a curled wig, an ornamented gold collar, and a belt with a golden lion head for a buckle. His kilt is made of leopard fur and his shoulder knots are shaped onto jackals.

Possible contemporary administrators of Khabawsokar may have been Hesyre, Metjen, Pehernefer and Akhetaa. Their tomb chapels are also known for their unusually rich decorations and for a detailed account of their careers. It is unsure whether these administrators have any connections to each other.

== Tomb ==
Khabawsokar's tomb, the double mastaba S3073, was found in 1889 at North Saqqara by French archaeologist Auguste Mariette. The tomb once measured circa 33 x 19 metres and was built of mud bricks. A short corridor leads to a broad hall, forming a t-shaped crossway; the hall has walls which are niched and covered with polished limestone.
