= Metjen =

Ancient Egyptian high official

- Confidant of the king
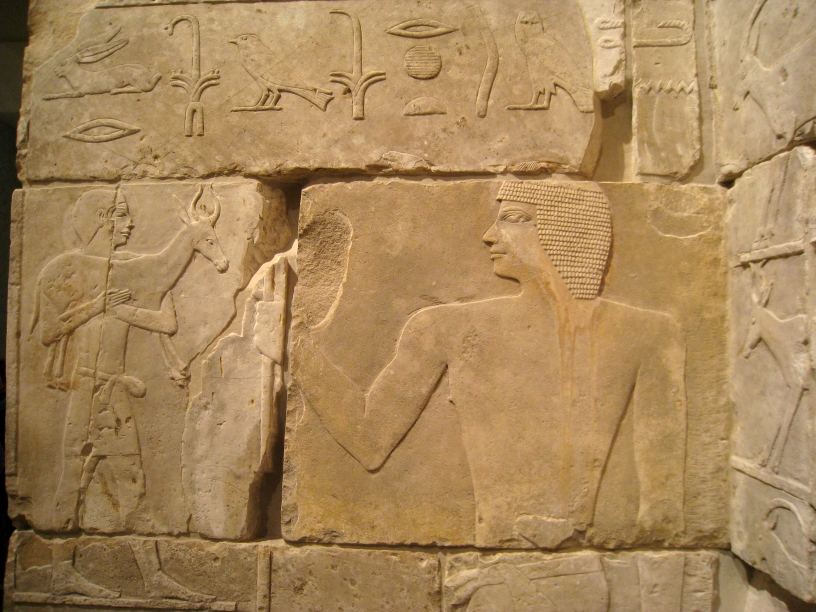
- Portrait and titles of Metjen from his tomb chapel.
Egyptian name
T14 m V13 n mṯn
The leader

Metjen (also read as Methen) was an ancient Egyptian high official at the transition time from 3rd Dynasty to 4th Dynasty. He is famous for his tomb inscription, which states that he worked and lived under the kings (pharaohs) Huni and Sneferu.

== Biography ==
=== Family ===
According to his tomb inscriptions, Metjen was a son of the high official Inpu-em-Ankh, a judge at the royal court of justice and a royal scribe. Metjen's mother was a high priestess named Neb-senet. Metjen's children were mentioned, but not named.

=== Titles ===
As a high-ranking official, Metjen bore several elite titularies:

- Confidant of the King (Egyptian: Rekh-neswt). This title allowed Metjen to receive audiences with the pharaoh.
- Great One of the 'Ten of Upper Egypt' (Egyptian: Wer-medi-shemaw). The exact meaning of this title is unknown. Some scholars believe it was a title associated with the royal court of justice.
- Privy council (Egyptian: Sa'ab). There is next to nothing known about this office, but it must have been one of the most prestigious curatorial and political posts of that era (right after the title "Great one of the 'Ten of Upper Egypt').
- Administrator of Hat-mehyt (Egyptian: Adj-mer Hat-mehyt).
- Administrator of Khepesh (Egyptian: Adj-mer Khepesh). The meaning of the last sign in the inscription is uncertain, but it could designate a certain nome (territories in Egypt).
- Administrator of the Khasuu-nome (Egyptian: Adj-mer-khasuu).
- Curator of the endowment estate of King Huni in the Khepesh nome (Egyptian: Heqa-hwt-Huni-khepesh). The location of the estate is unknown, but it is mentioned on the Palermo stone.
- Curator of the Ka-house of Queen Nimaathapi (Egyptian: Heqa-hwt-ka-Nimaathapi).

His parents' support of his career is mentioned.

=== Career ===
Metjen's tomb inscriptions are of the highest interest to Egyptologists and historians alike. They are the earliest known Ancient Egyptian texts detailing more than titles or instructions for offerings. Metjen was one of the first officials in high office that reported on his own professional and curatorial career. His official and honorary titles are listed in chronological order.

According to Metjen's autobiography, some high ranking titles were assigned to him by his father. He also inherited his father's titles after his death. These titles included several decrees which allowed Metjen to found his own estates and some small towns.

Metjen began his career as a royal scribe. He later became the overseer of the royal scribes and confidant to the king. He progressed to an administrator of several palatinates and royal storages. Finally, he became "the Great One of the 'Ten of Upper Egypt'" and a member of a type of privy council. The royal house gave several estates to Metjen. He founded a town called Sheret-Metjen (Egyptian: Šr.t-Mṯn) at his favorite estate.

As a sign of gratitude, Metjen donated hundreds of precious trees to other royal domains. At the peak of his career, Metjen was the mayor of several cities, the curator of the endowment estate of King Huni, and supervisor of the mortuary cult for Queen Nimaathapi.

His contemporary office holders included Netjeraperef, Khabawsokar, Pehernefer and Akhetaa, They were fellow administrators under the reigns of both Huni and Sneferu. Tomb inscriptions reveal that the reigns of both of these kings were very prosperous. The economy flourished, along with the administrators.

== Tomb ==
Metjen's tomb, mastaba L6, was found in 1842 by the German Egyptologist Carl Richard Lepsius at Saqqara. He excavated the tomb and ordered its dismantling for preservation. Metjen's tomb chapels are on display at the Egyptian Museum of Berlin. A 47 cm tall granite sculpture was found on site. The Statue of Metjen has an inscription of Metjem's name and titles.
