= Swelim =

Swelim (Egyptian Arabic: ﺳﻮﻳﻠﻢ) is an Arabic surname, commonly used in Egypt. Notable people with the surname include:

- Kareem Swelim (born 1996), Jeddah-born American Egyptian Mechanical Engineer
- Amr Swelim (born 1984), Cairo-born professional squash player
- Nabil Swelim (1930–2015), Egyptian Egyptologist
- Tarek Swelim (1958–2023), Egyptian art historian
