= Nabil Swelim =

Egyptian Egyptologist (1930–2015)

- نبيل ﺳﻮﻳﻠﻢ
- Born: 1930
- Died: September 23, 2015 (aged 84–85)
- Occupation: Egyptologist
- Children: Tarek Swelim

Academic background
- Education: Eötvös Loránd University (PhD, Summa cum laude,1981); Egyptian Naval College(1952)
- Website: nabilswelim.com

Nabil M. A. Swelim (Arabic: نبيل ﺳﻮﻳﻠﻢ; 1930 – September 23, 2015) was an Egyptian Egyptologist who specialized in the study of pyramids.

Nabil Swelim first embarked on a career as an officer in the Egyptian Navy. He graduated with a bachelor's degree from the Egyptian Naval College.

He discovered the dry moat surrounding the Pyramid of Djoser and the Pyramid of Sinki.

He was part of a team of archaeologists who visited Bosnia to investigate the Bosnian pyramid claims.

He is the father of the art historian Tarek Swelim.

== Publications ==
- Some Problems on the History of the Third Dynasty, Alexandria 1983.
- The Brick Pyramid at Abu Rawash Number "1" by Lepsius: A Preliminary Study, Alexandria 1987.
- Alexandrian Studies in Memoriam Daoud Abdu Daoud, BSAA 45(1993) Editor.
- The Pyramid Hills: Visočica and Plješevica Hrašće, Observations, and Analyses. Sarajevo 2007.
- 7 Layer Monuments of the Early Old Kingdom
- Pyramids of the Third to the Thirteenth Dynasty, Analyses, Catalogues and Developments; 4 Volumes in Preparation
- Contribution to Festschrifts of: I.E.S. Edwards, W. Kaiser, J. Leclant, L. Kakosy, J-Ph. Lauer, D. Arnold, E. Gaal – U. Luft – L. Torok, Mafred Bietak, Ali Rawan, Gunter Dreyer and Gaballa Aly Gaballa.
- Contribution to Memorials of: D. A. Daoud, and Abd El Aziz Sadek (Azzouz).
- Encyclopedia Entries: Macmillan's Dictionary of Art (2)
- Articles in: Archaeological and Historical Studies, 4, 5 and 7; MDAIK, 38, 47 and 53; JSSEA, 14
- Occasional Publications: 7 (EES); Studia Aegyptiaca, XIV, XVII; IFAO Bd’E 106-1; BSAA 45; Bibliotheca Alexandrina, the ANCE.
