= Tarek Swelim =

Egyptian art historian (1958–2023)

- طارق ﺳﻮﻳﻠﻢ
- Born: 1958; Alexandria, Egypt
- Died: 2023 (aged 64–65)
- Occupations: Art historian, photographer
- Parent: Nabil Swelim

Academic background
- Education: Helwan University; American University in Cairo; Harvard University (PhD)

Muhamad Tarek Swelim (1958 – 2023) was an Egyptian art historian and photographer.

He earned his bachelor's degree in 1979 from Helwan University, a master's degree in Islamic art from the American University in Cairo in 1986, and a PhD in Islamic art and architecture from Harvard University in 1994. He was a professor at Hamad Bin Khalifa University in Qatar.

His father is Egyptologist Nabil Swelim.

He died on 2 September 2023.

== Bibliography ==
- The History and Religious Heritage of Old Cairo: Its Fortress, Churches, Synagogue, and Mosque (Ludwig Publishing ed.). Cairo: American University in Cairo Press. 2016. ISBN 9774167694.
- Ibn Tulun: His Lost City and Great Mosque. Cairo: The American University in Cairo Press. 2015. ISBN 978-9774166914.
