= Coronation of the pharaoh =

Ritual in Ancient Egypt

Coronation in hieroglyphs
M23 X1 N35 N28
khaj-nisut
ḫˁj-nsw.t
Appearance of the king

A coronation was an extremely important ritual in early and ancient Egyptian history, concerning the change of power and rulership between two succeeding pharaohs. The accession to the throne was celebrated in several ceremonies, rites and feasts.

== Origins ==
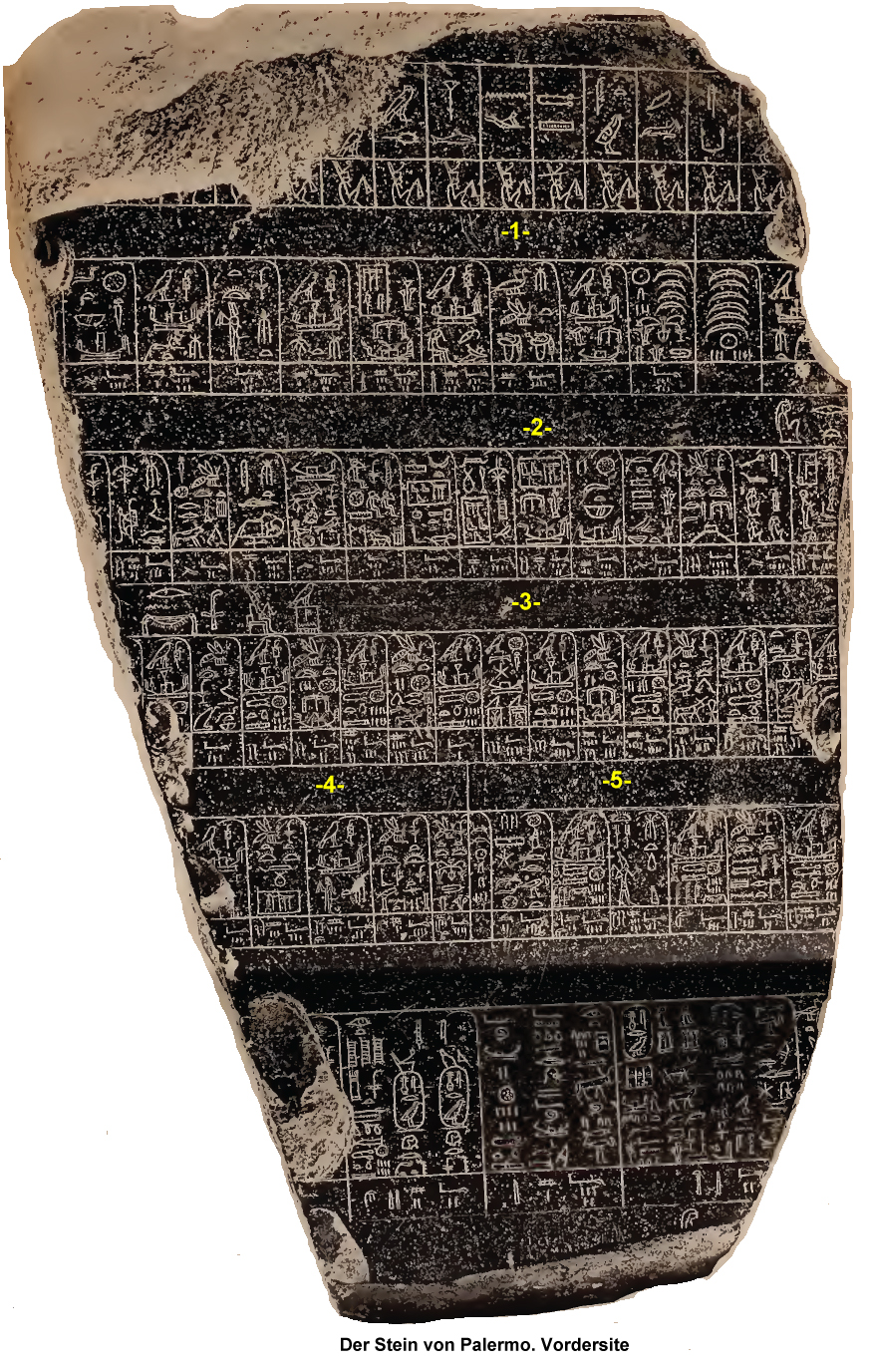
The Palermo stone

The coronation feast was not one event but rather a long lasting process including several festivals, rites and ceremonies lasting up to a full year. For this reason, Egyptologists today describe the year that a new pharaoh acceded to power as the "year of the coronation".

The earliest depictions of rites and ceremonies concerning an accession to the throne may be found on objects from the reign of the predynastic king Scorpion II, circa 3100 BC. At this time, the change between rulers may have been marked by wars and invasions from neighboring Egyptian proto-kingdoms. This is similar to the military action taken by enemies of Egypt in later history: for example, upon hearing the news of Hatshepsut's death, the king of Kadesh advanced his army to Megiddo in the hope that Thutmose III would not be in a position to respond. From king Narmer (founder of the 1st Dynasty) onwards, wars between Egyptian proto-kingdoms may have been replaced by symbolic ceremonies and festivals.

The most important sources of information about accessions to the throne and coronation ceremonies are the inscriptions of the Palermo stone, a black basalt stone slab listing the kings from the 1st Dynasty down to king Neferirkare Kakai, third pharaoh of the 5th Dynasty. The stone also records various events during a king's reign, such as the creation of statues, city and domain foundations, cattle counts and religious feasts such as the Sed festival. The stone also gives the exact date of a ruler's accession to the throne. The first year of a ruler on the throne, the "year of coronation", was not counted in a king's regnal year count, and the stone mentions only the most important ceremonies that took place in this year.

== Ceremonies ==
As already mentioned, the coronation included several, long lasting festivals, rites and ceremonies the king had to celebrate first, before they were allowed to wear the crown(s) of Egypt. The following describes the most important ceremonies:

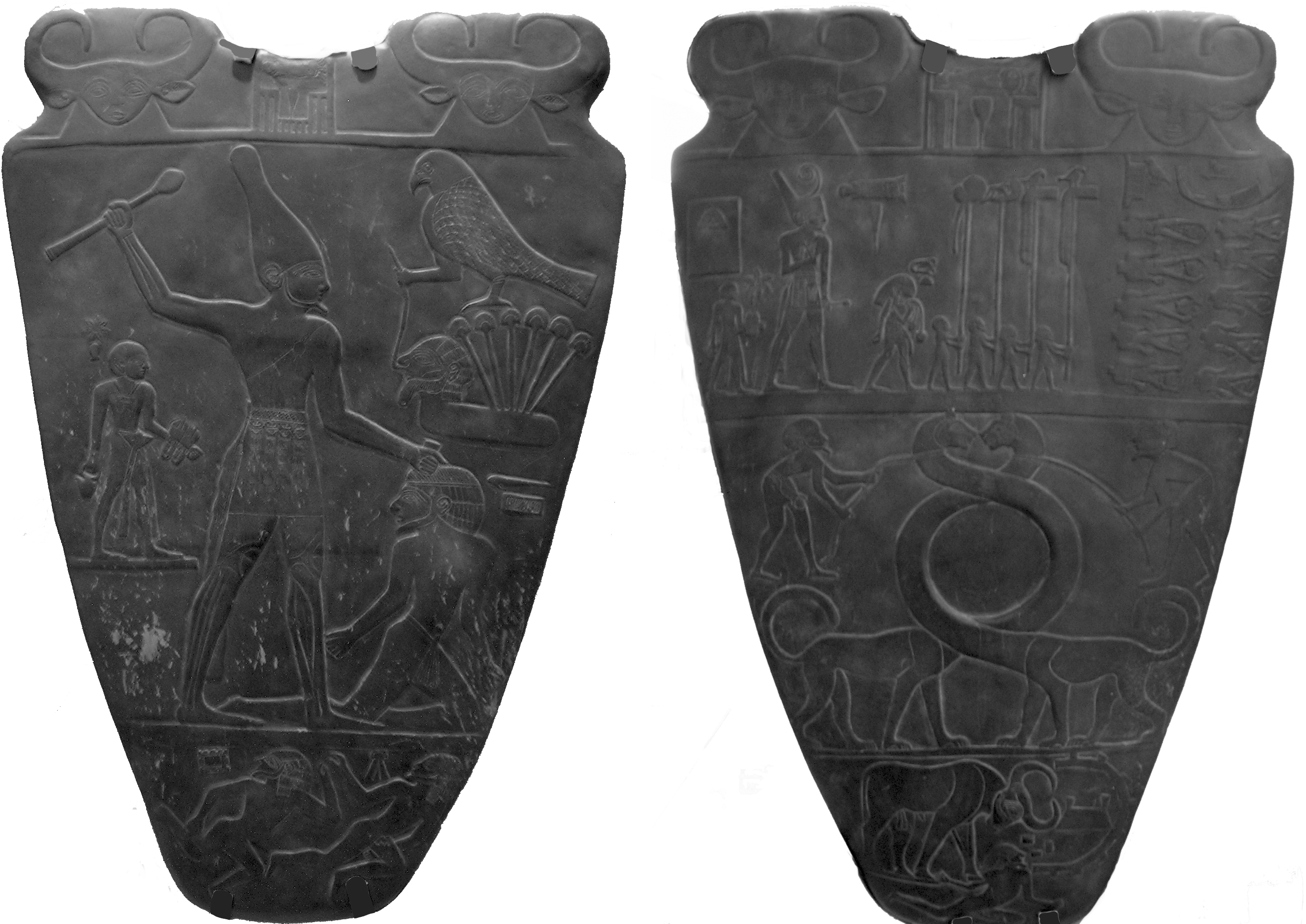
The Narmer Palette, showing Narmer smiting an enemy and, on the reverse, the two serpopards.

Unification of Upper and Lower Egypt

The "unification of Upper and Lower Egypt" may have been connected with the traditional "smiting of the enemy" in predynastic times, a ritual in which the leader of the defeated realm was struck dead with a ceremonial mace by the victorious king. The most famous depiction of this ritual may be seen on the ceremonial palette of king Narmer. On the reverse of the palette, mythological and symbolic elements have been added to this picture: the two serpopards (leopards with unusually elongated necks) with entwined necks may symbolize a more peaceful unification of Upper and Lower Egypt. Another symbolic depiction of the unification feast appears on a throne relief dating to the reign of king Senusret I, second pharaoh of the 12th Dynasty. It shows the deities Horus and Seth wrapping a papyrus haulm and a lotus haulm around a trachea ending in a djed pillar, an act representing the enduring unification of the two lands under Senusret I.

Circumambulation of the White Walls

The ceremony of the "circumambulation of the White Walls" is known from the inscriptions on the Palermo stone. According to legends, the "White Walls", in Egyptian Inebu Hedj, today's Memphis, were erected by the mythical king Menes as the central seat of government of Egypt. The circumambulation of the walls of Memphis, celebrated with a ritual procession around the city, was performed to strengthen the king's right to the throne and his claim to the city as his new seat of power.

Appearance of the king

The feast "appearance of the king" is likewise known from inscriptions on the Palermo stone. This feast was held immediately after the coronation, as a confirmation of the king's right to rule. After the end of the year of the coronation, the feast was celebrated every second year. Much later Egyptian sources reveal that this feast comprised three steps: first was the "appearance of the King of Upper Egypt", in Egyptian khaj-nisut, then came the "appearance of the king of Lower Egypt", in Egyptian khaj-bitj, and finally the "appearance of the king of Upper and Lower Egypt", khaj-nisut-bitj, also known as the "appearance of the dual king". Although first introduced by Khasekhemwy, the last pharaoh of 2nd Dynasty, the earliest known mention of this feast dates back to the reign of his son Djoser, first pharaoh of 3rd Dynasty.

Sed feast

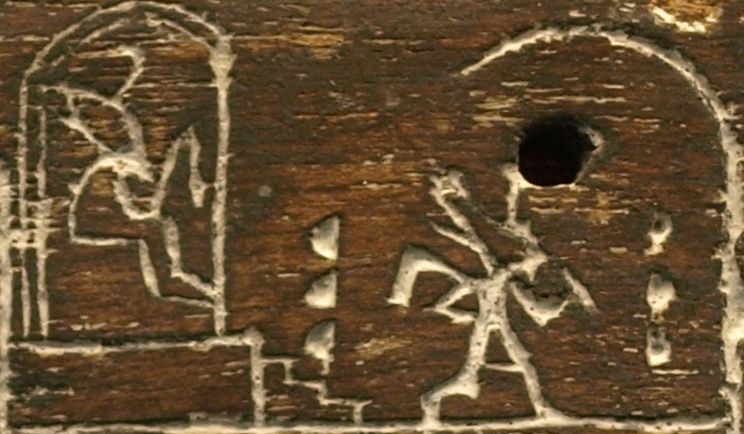
Ebony year label of Den performing a ritual race part of his Sed festival.

One of the most important feasts of Ancient Egypt linked with a king's time on the throne was the Sed festival, the heb-sed. It included many complex rituals, which are not fully understood up to this day and which are seldom depicted. The first celebration of the feast was held during the year of the coronation. After that, the next celebration was held in the 30th year of the pharaoh on the throne, and the Sed festival was thus named by the ancient Greeks as the Triakontaeteris, meaning "30-year-jubilee". After this jubilee, the Sed feast was normally celebrated every third year, although this rule was broken by various pharaohs, in particular Ramses II who celebrated a total of 14 Sed festivals in 66 years on the throne. Early dynastic rulers, for which at least one Sed feast is archaeologically attested, include Narmer, Den, Qa'a, Nynetjer and possibly Wadjenes. Rare depictions of rites associated to the Sed festival come from Old Kingdom reliefs found in galleries beneath Djoser's step pyramid at Saqqara, as well as from Dashur, dating to the reign of Sneferu (the founder of the 4th Dynasty).

Some kings simply claimed to have celebrated a Sed festival, despite archaeological evidences proof that they did not rule for 30 years. Such kings include Anedjib (in the 1st Dynasty) and Akhenaten, in the 18th Dynasty.

Sokar feast

The "Sokar festival" is – alongside the Sed festival – one of the oldest festivals. It is already mentioned on predynastic artefacts and often mentioned on ivory labels belonging to the kings Scorpion II, Narmer, Aha and Djer. The early forms of this feast included the creation of a ceremonial rowing boat with a cult image of the god Sokar. The boat was then pulled by the king to a sacred lake or to the Nile. Another ritual was the erecting of a richly loaded djed-pillar. In early times, the feast was celebrated during the coronation in attempt to mark the (physical or symbolic) death of the predecessor, from 2nd dynasty onwards, the Sokar feast was repeated every sixth year, the fifth celebration coincided with the Sed festival. As far as is known, the ceremony of the Sokar feast was connected as well to the coronation of a new king as to the foundation of his future tomb. Sokar was the god of the underworld and one of the holy guardians of royal cemeteries.

Suckling of the young king

This ceremony was introduced during the 6th dynasty under king Pepy II who acceded to the throne aged 6. The "suckling of the young king" was never performed practically but rather represented through small figurines depicting the king as a naked toddler, sitting on the lap of the goddess Isis, being breastfed by her. This representation may have been created to ostentate the divine nature of the pharaoh. The king breastfed by Isis may have inspired later Christian artists to create the Madonna and child portraits. Later pharaonic pictures show the king as a young man being breastfed by the holy Imat-tree.

== Throne rights ==
=== Inheritance rights ===
The right to the throne of Egypt was normally inherited by direct filiation, the eldest son being the heir of his father. Occasionally the throne was inherited between brothers, for example from Djedefre to Khafre. It is worth mentioning a possible case of peaceful throne succession via interfamilial negotiation which may have happened at the end of Nynetjer's rule. Because he possibly decided to separate Upper and Lower Egypt, he may have chosen two of his sons at the same time to rule over the two lands. A later example, namely that of Sahure and Neferirkare Kakai, may provide a case of dynastic problems between two separate but related royal houses. It is possible that one of Sahure's son, Shepseskare, tried to succeed his nephew Neferefre on throne after the latter died unexpectedly. This is likely to have created a dynastic feud as Nyuserre Ini, a son of Neferefre, finally assumed the throne only a few months later. The throne could also be obtained by marriage in case the only living heir was a woman as may have been the case from Sneferu to Khufu.

=== Election ===
In this context, Egyptologists such as Sue D'Auria, Rainer Stadelmann and Silke Roth point to a problem mostly ignored by mainstream of scholars: There have demonstrably been crown princes, especially during the Old Kingdom period, who held the highest imaginable honorary and functionary titles at their lifetimes, but they never became kings, despite the fact, that they definitively survived their ruling fathers. Such known crown princes include: Nefermaat, Rahotep (both under the reign of Snofru), Kawab and Khufukhaf(crown princes of Khufu), Setka (crown prince of Radjedef) and, possibly, Kanefer. The famous vizir Imhotep, who held office under king Djoser, was even entitled as "twin of the king", but Djoser was followed by either Sekhemkhet or Sanakht, not by Imhotep. This leads to the question as what exactly happened during the election of the next throne successor and who of the royal family was allowed to raise any inheritance claims. It also remains unclear, who of the royal family was permitted to vote for the throne successor. The exact details of the election process are unknown, because they were never written down. Thus, no contemporary document explains as under which conditions a crown prince received inheritance rights and why so many crown princes were never crowned.

Rainer Stadelmann points to an ancient society within the Egyptian elite, which existed as early as the predynastic time: the "Great Ten of Upper Egypt/Lower Egypt". These two societies consisted of altogether twenty elite officials of unknown origin, who possibly were responsible for the solving of any political and dynastic problem. Stadelmann explains, that most of all known, traditional offices were described in their missions and functions, except for the office "One of the Great Ten of...". And yet, this very title seemed to have been one of the most regarded and wanted, as only officials with many honorary titles were bearing it (for example, Hesyra). For this reason, Stadelmann and D'Auria believe, that the "Great Ten" consisted of some kind of royal court of justice.
