= Shepseskare =

Egyptian pharaoh

- Sisires
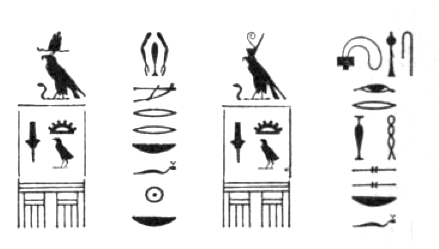
- Drawing by Georges Daressy of a bronze cylinder seal of Shepseskare bearing his Horus name "Sekhemkhaw"

Pharaoh
- Reign: Around a few months, c. 2458 BC or seven years in the mid 25th century BC (Note: Proposed dates for Shepseskare's reign: 2482–2475 BC, 2467–2460 BC, 2463–2456 BC, 2455–2448 BC, 2438–2431 BC, 2403 BC.)
- Predecessor: Neferefre, Neferirkare Kakai, or Nyuserre Ini
- Successor: Nyuserre Ini or Neferefre
Royal titulary
Horus name
Sekhemkhaw
Sḫm-ḫˁ.w
Horus, He whose apparitions are powerful
G5	S42 N28 G43
Prenomen
Shepseskare
Špss-k3-Rˁ
The Ka of Ra is noble
M23 t L2 t < N5 A51 S29 S29 D28 >Turin canon:
Niswt Shepseskare Maat Kheru
Niswt Špss-k3-Rˁ M3ˁ-ḫrw
King Shepseskare the justified
M23 t n A43 < N5 A51 S29 S29 D28 > Aa11 P8
Nomen
Netjeruser
Nṯr-wsr
He whose strength is divine
G39 N5 < R8 G43 F12 S29 D21 >
- Father: Possibly Sahure, Neferirkare Kakai, or Neferefre
- Mother: Possibly Meretnebty
- Died: c. 2458 BC
- Monuments: Unfinished trench in North Abusir representing the earliest stages of a pyramid
- Dynasty: Fifth Dynasty

Shepseskare or Shepseskara (Egyptian for "Noble is the Soul of Ra"; died c. 2458 BC) was an Ancient Egyptian king, the fourth or fifth ruler of the Fifth Dynasty (2494–2345 BC) during the Old Kingdom period. Shepseskare lived in the mid-25th century BC and was probably the owner of an unfinished pyramid in Abusir, which was abandoned after a few weeks of work in the earliest stages of its construction.

Following historical sources, Shepseskare was traditionally believed to have reigned for seven years, succeeding Neferirkare Kakai and preceding Neferefre on the throne, making him the fourth ruler of the dynasty. He is the most obscure ruler of this dynasty and the Egyptologist Miroslav Verner has strongly argued that Shepseskare's reign lasted only a few months at the most, after that of Neferefre. This conclusion is based upon the state and location of Shepseskare's unfinished pyramid in Abusir as well as the very small number of artefacts attributable to this king. Verner's arguments have now convinced several Egyptologists such as Darrell Baker and Erik Hornung. After the discovery of a seal impression of Shepseskare in 2022 the Egyptologist Masimiliano Nuzzolo has proposed that Shepeseskare ruled after Nyuserre Ini.

Shepseskare's relations to his predecessor and successor are not known for certain. Verner has proposed that he was a son of Sahure and a brother to Neferirkare Kakai, who briefly seized the throne following the premature death of his predecessor and probable nephew, Neferefre. Shepseskare may himself have died unexpectedly or he may have lost the throne to another of his nephews, the future pharaoh Nyuserre. The possibility that Shepseskare was a short-lived usurper from outside the royal family cannot be totally excluded. Nuzzolo observes that too little is known on Shepseskare to assert Fifth Dynasty family relationships with certitude.

== Attestations ==
=== Contemporaneous sources ===
Shepseskare was a king of Ancient Egypt, the fourth or fifth ruler of the Fifth Dynasty. Egypt was unified at the time, with its capital located at Memphis. Shepseskare is the least-known king of the Fifth Dynasty as very few artefacts dating to his reign have survived to this day. Only three cylinder seals of Shepseskare are known: one, made of bronze, bears Shepseskare's Horus name and was uncovered in the ruins of Memphis in the early 20th century. (Note: The seal is now in the Cairo Museum under the catalog number JE 45041.) The second seal, of unknown provenance, is made of black serpentine and reads "Shepseskare beloved of the gods, Shepseskare beloved of Hathor". (Note: The seal is now in the G. Mikhailides collection.) The third is an unfinished stone seal showing Shepseskare's Horus name next to those of Nyuserre's pyramid and sun temple. Beyond these three seals the only surviving artefacts attributable to Shepseskare are five fragments of seal impressions on clay from Abusir, six further fragments discovered in the mortuary temple and Sanctuary of the Knife of the Pyramid of Neferefre, also in Abusir. These fragments probably come from three different seals and were most likely placed on the doors of magazine rooms in the temple. In 2022, a further clay seal impression bearing Shepseskare's Horus name Sekhemkhaw was uncovered in the immediate vicinity of Nyuserre's Abusir sun temple.

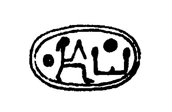
Drawing by Flinders Petrie of a scarab seal reading "Shepeskare" [sic] but probably dating to the Saite period

Finally, there is a single scarab seal reading "Shepeskare" [sic] that the Egyptologist Flinders Petrie attributed to Shepseskare at the end of the 19th century. Modern scholars doubt this attribution and rather believe the scarab to be a work of the much later Saite period (685–525 BC) executed in archaic style. Equally, the scarab could belong to Gemenefkhonsbak Shepeskare, an obscure kinglet of Tanis during the 25th Dynasty (760–656 BC).

=== Historical sources ===
The only ancient Egyptian king list mentioning Shepseskare is the Saqqara Tablet (on the 28th entry). The tablet was inscribed during the reign of Ramesses II (1279–1213 BC), around 1,200 years after Shepseskare's lifetime, and records the dynastic succession Neferikare → Shepseskare → Neferkhare (a variant name of Neferefre). Shepseskare is completely absent from another king list dating to the same period: the Abydos king list, written during the reign of Seti I (1294–1279 BC). He is also absent from the Turin canon (reign of Ramses II), although in this case a lacuna affects the papyrus on which the list is written at the place where Shepseskare and Neferefre's names should have been. (Note: The lacuna is on the third column, entries 20 and 21. Because of the lacuna, it cannot be ascertained whether the canon listed Shepseskare before or after Neferefre.) Of the two entries concerning Shepseskare and Neferefre on the king list, only one reign length is still legible and it has been variously read as one year, eleven years or one to four months. The damaged state of the papyrus also makes it impossible to decide safely whose reign length this is.

Shepseskare was also likely mentioned in the Aegyptiaca, a history of Egypt written in the third century BC during the reign of Ptolemy II (283–246 BC) by the Egyptian priest Manetho. No copies of the Aegyptiaca have survived to this day and it is now known only through later writings by Sextus Julius Africanus and Eusebius. Africanus relates that the Aegyptiaca mentioned the succession "Nefercheres → Sisires → Cheres" for the mid Fifth Dynasty. Nefercheres and Cheres are believed to be the hellenized forms for Neferirkare and Neferkhare (that is Neferefre), respectively. Thus, "Sisires" is traditionally believed to be the Greek name of Shepseskare, making Manetho's reconstruction of the Fifth Dynasty in good agreement with the Saqqara tablet. Furthermore, according to Africanus, Manetho credits Sisires with seven years of reign while other sources report Manetho's figure as nine years.

== Reign ==
=== Chronological position ===
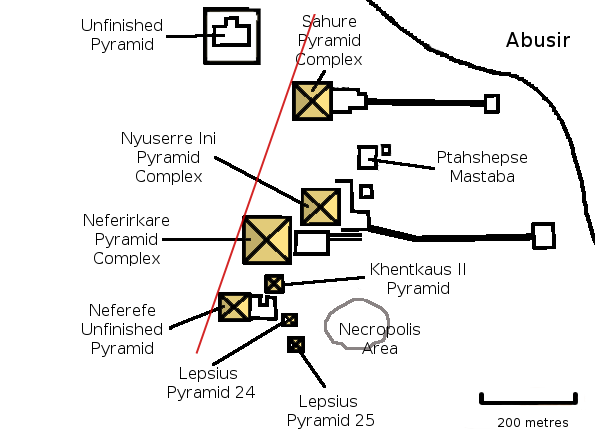
Map of the necropolis of Abusir. The unfinished pyramid is attributed to Shepseskare. The red line points to Heliopolis.

Both the relative chronological position and absolute dates of Shepseskare's reign are uncertain. The Saqqara Tablet records Shepseskare as the successor of Neferirkare Kakai and the predecessor of Neferefre, which became the traditional opinion among Egyptologists. Following discoveries in the early 1980s, the Czech Egyptologist Miroslav Verner advocates the hypothesis that Shepseskare succeeded, rather than preceded, Neferefre.

In support of this hypothesis, Verner first emphasizes the presence of several clay seal impressions bearing Shepseskare's Horus name "Sekhemkaw" (meaning "He whose apparitions are powerful") in the oldest part of Neferere's mortuary temple, which was not built "until Neferefre's death". This appears to suggest that Shepseskare ruled after—rather than before—Neferefre. (Note: Three facts are mentioned concerning these seals: 1) they were found in a temple that was built only after Neferefre's death, i.e. the seals too were placed there after Neferefre's death. 2) Such seals would exist only if Shepseskare's was or had already been king at the time of their deposition in Neferefre's temple. 3) The seals were found in the oldest part of Neferefre's temple, but the temple is known to have been completed by Nyuserre. The simplest explanation that Verner has proposed for these facts is that Shepseskare lived after (and not before) Neferefre, and that he placed offerings (in boxes bearing the seals) in Neferefre's temple, which was then very small, being unfinished. In other words, Verner sees Shespeskare as building a small part of Neferefre's temple, filling it with offering bearing his seals, then dying only to be succeeded by Nyuserre who completed the temple.) Verner's second argument concerns the alignment of pyramids of Sahure, Neferirkare Kakai and Neferefre: they form a line pointing to Heliopolis, just as the three pyramids of Giza do. (Note: Heliopolis housed the main temple of Ra, which was the most important religious center in the country at the time. The temple was visible from both Abusir and Giza and was probably located where the lines from the Abusir and Giza necropolises intersected.) In contrast, Shepseskare's unfinished pyramid does not fall on the line to Heliopolis, which strongly suggests that Neferefre's pyramid had already been in place when Shepseskare started his. Finally, Verner observes that Neferefre is known to have been Neferirkare's eldest son and around 20 years old when his father died so that he was in optimal position to inherit the throne. Shepseskare thus most likely took the throne after Neferefre. As Verner notes, while Shepseskare is noted as the immediate predecessor of Neferefre in the Saqqara tablet, "this slight discrepancy can ... be attributed to the [political] disorders of the time and its dynastic disputes."

At the opposite of Verner's hypothesis, Massimiliano Nuzzolo has recently proposed that Shepseskare reigned after both Neferefre and Nyuserre. To support this analysis, Nuzzolo points to three arguments. Firstly is a seal impression bearing Shepseskare's Horus name discovered in 2022 in a pit dug into Nyuserre's sun temple some time after Nyuserre's reign and before that of Teti. The pit presumably dates to the post-Nyuserre period since it contained a single seal of Shepsekare as well as seal impressions bearing "the names of Djedkara (twice), Unis (twice), and Teti. Neither Nyuserra nor any names of kings ruling before Nyuserra are attested, if we exclude of course the seal-impression of Shepseskara that we are discussing here." Nuzzolo notes that while the seal impression of Shepseskare may be an "intrusive object, or residual material belonging to an earlier (than Nyuserra) phase of occupation of the temple", it is strange that all the other seal impression found in the pit date to kings from the post-Nyuserre era. Secondly, there is an actual stone cylinder seal bearing Shepseskare's name "found in situ (i.e., in the sun temple of Nyuserra) by Borchardt," which records "the names of both the sun temple and the pyramid of Nyuserra. The latter element is crucial in terms of chronology, for it seems to indicate that Shepseskara was a successor and not a predecessor of Nyuserra." This evidence alone strongly implies that Shepsekare ruled after Nyuserre. Thirdly, is the biography of Ptahshepses who, according to Nuzzolo, could well have mentioned Shepseskare after Nyuserre in its missing portion and not before. For Nuzzolo, this constitutes enough evidence to strongly question Verner's hypothesis.

=== Duration ===
In two articles published in 2000 and 2001, Verner argues that, contrary to what Manetho indicates, Shepseskare must have reigned for a couple of months at the most, a hypothesis already proposed by the French Egyptologist Nicolas Grimal in 1988 and shared by Nuzzolo. Verner's conclusion is based on the archeological record, in particular Shepseskare's intended pyramid at Abusir. Verner emphasizes that the progress of the pyramid, which is unfinished,

was interrupted [and] corresponds to the work of several weeks, perhaps no more than one or two months. In fact, the place was merely leveled and the excavation of the pit for the construction of the underground funerary apartment had only commenced. Moreover, the owner of the building obviously wanted to demonstrate by his choice of place (half-way between Sahure's pyramid and the sun temple of Userkaf) his relationship to either Sahure or Userkaf. Theoretically, only two kings of the Fifth Dynasty whose pyramids had not yet been identified can be taken into consideration – Shepseskara or Menkauhor. However, according to a number of contemporaneous documents, Menkauhor ... probably completed [his] pyramid elsewhere, in North Saqqara or Dahshur. Shepseskara, therefore, seems to be the likelier owner of the unfinished platform for a pyramid in North Abusir. Anyway, the builder of the platform [viz., Shepseskare] must have reigned for a very short time.

The rediscovery in 2008 of the Headless Pyramid in Saqqara and its subsequent attribution to Menkauhor Kaiu by the excavators under the direction of Zahi Hawass confirms Verner's attribution of the unfinished pyramid of Abusir to Shepseskare.

Unlike the other kings of the Fifth Dynasty, Shepseskare's name appears neither in the personal names of people of the time nor in the names of funerary estates. He is also absent from the titles and biographies of state officials. For example, the stela of the Fifth Dynasty official Khau-Ptah lists an uninterrupted sequence of kings whom he served under, namely Sahure, Neferirkare, Neferefre and Nyuserre. The omission of Shepseskare, be it between Neferirkare and Neferefre or between Neferefre and Nyuserre, indicates that his reign must have been very short. Since Manetho's Aegyptiaca dates to the third century BC, Khau-Ptah's contemporary account can be regarded as a more accurate indication of the political situation during the Fifth Dynasty.

Verner's arguments together with the scarcity of artefacts attributable to Shepseskare have now convinced many Egyptologists, such as Darrell Baker and Erik Hornung, that Shepseskare's reign was indeed ephemeral.

== Family ==
In view of the scarcity of sources concerning Shepseskare, nothing is known for certain about his relation to his predecessors. He was most likely a member of the royal family, although the possibility that he was a usurper unrelated to his predecessors cannot be totally excluded.

Silke Roth has proposed that Shepseskare was a son of Neferirkare Kakai and a brother of both Neferefre and Nyuserre Ini. Instead, Verner has proposed that Shepseskare was a son of Sahure who managed to briefly seize power after the premature death of Neferefre. This would explain the proximity of Shepseskare's unfinished pyramid to that of Sahure. Lending credence to this theory is the discovery by Verner and Tarek El Awady in 2005 of reliefs from the causeway of Sahure's pyramid complex showing him, his wife Meretnebty and their two sons Ranefer and Netjerirenre. The relief gives both sons the title of "king's eldest son", indicating that they were possibly twins. The relief further indicates that Ranefer took the throne as "Neferirkare king of Upper and Lower Egypt". Verner and Awady thus speculate that while Ranefer and his son Neferefre became kings, Netjerirenre could have attempted to seize the throne at the death of the latter. In this hypothesis Shepseskare would be the throne name of Netjerirenre. Verner had however himself written in 1997 that Shepseskare could equally be a son of Shepseskaf, last pharaoh of the Fourth Dynasty, or of Userkaf or Neferirkare Kakai as Roth suggested: so few are the actual evidences pertaining to the problem that all possibilities are just speculations. In yet another hypothesis, Jaromír Krejčí believes that Shepseskare was Neferefre's son.

Shepseskare's reign may have been cut short by his unexpected death or his claim to the throne could have been thwarted by Nyuserre Ini, Neferefre's younger brother and the younger son of King Neferirkare and Queen Khentkaus II. Khentkaus II's pivotal role in Nyuserre's eventual accession to the throne might explain her high esteem in Egyptian folklore and "the additional enlargement and upgrading of her mortuary temple" by Nyuserre. Nyuserre also seemed to have been favored by powerful courtiers and officials, foremost among whom was Ptahshepses, who would become Nyuserre's son-in-law and vizier.

== Building activities ==
=== Pyramid ===
An unfinished pyramid located in north Abusir, between the sun temple of Userkaf and the Pyramid of Sahure, is believed to belong to Shepseskare. The structure was discovered in 1980 by a Czechoslovak archaeological team led by Miroslav Verner and seems to have been abandoned after no more than a few weeks or months of work. A square area of roughly 100 m^{2} (1,100 sq ft) was leveled and the digging of a T-shaped ditch was just started in its center. This ditch was to be left open during the pyramid construction to allow for simultaneous works on the pyramid filling and its substructures. This construction technique is common to all pyramids of the Fifth Dynasty and can directly be seen in the case of the Pyramid of Neferefre, which was also left unfinished. This technique as well as the location of the unfinished pyramid in the royal necropolis of the Fifth Dynasty indicates that it belonged in all likeliness to Shepseskare, the pyramids of the other kings of the dynasty being already known. If finished according to the established pattern, the pyramid would have reached 73 m (240 ft) high, similar to the Pyramid of Neferirkare.

Analyzing the fragments of clay seals bearing Shepeseskare's name, the Swiss Egyptologist Peter Kaplony has proposed that the ancient name of Shepseskare's pyramid could be reconstructed as Rsj-Špss-k3-Rˁ, reading "Resj-Shespeskare" and meaning "The awakening of Shepseskare". Verner rejects this hypothesis, and he contests the reading of certain signs and their interpretation as the name of a pyramid.

=== Sun temple ===
Kaplony has proposed that Shepseskare started to build a sun temple named Ḥtp-jb-Rˁ, reading "Hotepibre" and meaning "Satisfied is the heart of Ra". Although all the kings of the early to mid-Fifth Dynasty, from Userkaf to Menkauhor Kaiu, did build sun temples, Verner regards Kaplony's hypothesis as "sheer speculation" since it is based on the tentative reconstruction of a single clay seal. Verner first argues that this seal is not inscribed with Shepseskare's name but rather bears traces of a Horus name which could equally well be that of Djedkare Isesi. (Note: The Horus name of Djedkare Isesi is Djedkhau.) Second, Verner notes that the name of a sun temple is rarely found with that of the king who built it: more often it is found with the name of another king during whose reign the seal was made. Finally, he doubts that the sign reading Ḥtp, "Hotep", is really part of the name of a sun temple. Instead, he believes it is more probable that the seal either refers to the sun temple of Neferirkare, named St-jb-Rˁ.w, that is "Setibraw"; or to that of Nyuserre, which was called Šsp-jb-Rˁ, "Shesepibre".

=== Mortuary temple of Neferefre ===
It is possible that Shepseskare continued the construction of the funerary complex of his predecessor. As Neferefre had died after a short reign, his pyramid complex was far from finished and neither the burial chamber nor the mortuary temple had been built. The planned pyramid was thus hastily changed into a square mastaba representing a stylized primeval hill and the accompanying mortuary temple was completed during the reign of Nyuserre. The presence of seals of Shepseskare in the oldest part of Neferefre's mortuary temple could indicate that the former also undertook construction works there. The evidence for such works is uncertain: these seals could have been placed on boxes which were later moved into the magazine rooms of the temple. For example, seals of Userkaf, Sahure and Neferirkare Kakai were also found in the temple, while these three pharaohs died before Neferefre's reign.

== Bibliography ==
- Abdallatif, Tareq Fahmy; Abd‐All, Esmat Mohamed; Suh, Mancheol; Mostafa Mohamad, Reem; El‐Hemaly, Ibrahim Aly (2005-04-05). "Magnetic tracing at Abu Sir (land of forgotten pyramids), northern Egypt". Geoarchaeology. 20 (5): 483–503. doi:10.1002/gea.20058. ISSN 0883-6353.
- Arnold, Dorothea (July 19, 1999). "Old Kingdom Chronology and List of Kings". Metropolitan Museum of Art.
- Baker, Darrell (2008). The Encyclopedia of the Pharaohs: Volume I - Predynastic to the Twentieth Dynasty 3300–1069 BC. Stacey International. ISBN 978-1-905299-37-9.
- Callender, V. G. (2011). "Curious Names of Some Old Kingdom Royal Women^{*}". The Journal of Egyptian Archaeology. 97 (1): 127–142. doi:10.1177/030751331109700109. ISSN 0307-5133.
- Chauvet, Violaine (2002). "Abusir Realm of Osiris. Miroslav Verner". Near Eastern Archaeology. 65 (3): 214–215. doi:10.2307/3210886. ISSN 1094-2076.
- Clayton, Peter (1994). Chronicle of the Pharaohs. Thames & Hudson. ISBN 978-0-500-05074-3.
- Daressy, Georges Émile Jules (1915). "Cylindre en bronze de l'ancien empire". Annales du Service des Antiquités de l'Égypte. 15.
- El Awady, Tarek (2006). "The royal family of Sahure. New evidence.". In Bárta, Miroslav; Krejčí, Jaromír (eds.). Abusir and Saqqara in the Year 2005. Proceedings of the Conference Held in Prague (June 27 – July 5, 2005). Prague: Academy of Sciences of the Czech Republic, Oriental Institute. pp. 198–203. ISBN 978-80-7308-116-4.
- Gardiner, Alan (1988). Royal Canon of Turin. Griffith Institute, new edition. ISBN 978-0-900416-48-4.
- Grimal, Nicolas (1988). Histoire de l'Egypte ancienne (in French). Fayard. ISBN 978-2-7028-2142-8.
- Hawass, Zahi; Senussi, Ashraf (2008). Old Kingdom Pottery from Giza. American University in Cairo Press. ISBN 978-977-305-986-6.
- Hayes, William (1978). The Scepter of Egypt: A Background for the Study of the Egyptian Antiquities in The Metropolitan Museum of Art. Vol. 1, From the Earliest Times to the End of the Middle Kingdom. New York: Metropolitan Museum of Art. OCLC 7427345.
- Hornung, Erik; Krauss, Rolf; Warburton, David, eds. (2012). Ancient Egyptian Chronology. Handbook of Oriental Studies. Leiden, Boston: Brill. ISBN 978-90-04-11385-5. ISSN 0169-9423.
- Jacquet-Gordon, Helen (1962). Les noms des domaines funéraires sous l'ancien empire égyptien (in French). Le Caire : Imprimerie de l'Institut français d'archéologie orientale. OCLC 18402032.
- Kaplony, Peter (1981). Die Rollsiegel des Alten Reiches. Katalog der Rollsiegel II. Allgemeiner Teil mit Studien zum Köningtum des Alten Reichs II. Katalog der Rollsiegel A. Text B. Tafeln (in German). Bruxelles: Fondation Egyptologique Reine Élisabeth. ISBN 978-0-583-00301-8.
- Kratovac, Katarina (June 6, 2008). "Archaeologists Uncover 4,000-Year-Old Missing Egyptian Pyramid" (Press release). Associated Press. Archived from the original on 2016-01-16.
- Krejčí, Jaromír; Arias Kytnarová, Katarína; Odler, Martin (2015). "Archaeological excavation of the mastaba of Queen Khentkaus III (Tomb AC 30)" (PDF). Prague Egyptological Studies. XV. Czech Institute of Archaeology: 28–42.
- Lehner, Mark (2008). The Complete Pyramids. Thames & Hudson. ISBN 978-0-500-28547-3.
- Lloyd, Alan (2010). Lloyd, Alan (ed.). A Companion to Ancient Egypt. Volume I. Wiley-Blackwell. ISBN 978-1-4051-5598-4.
- Malek, Jaromir (1982). "The special features of the "Saqqara king list"". Journal of the Society for the Study of Egyptian Antiquities. 12: 21–28.
- Mariette, Auguste (1889). Maspero, Gaston (ed.). Les Mastabas de l'Ancien Empire, Fragments du Dernier Ouvrage d'Auguste Édouard Mariette (in French). Paris. OCLC 2654989.
- Nuzzolo, Massimiliano (2025). "A New Seal-Impression of King Shepseskara and the Fifth Dynasty Chronology". Ägypten und Levante. Internationale Zeitschrift für ägyptische Archäologie und deren Nachbargebiete. 34: 393–418. doi:10.1553/AEundL34s393.
- O'Mara, Patrick (1997). "Manetho and the Turin Canon: A Comparison of Regnal Years". Göttinger Miszellen. 158: 49–61.
- Petrie, Flinders (1976). Historical scarabs: a series of drawings from the principal collections, arranged chronologically (Reprint of the 1889 ed. published by D. Nutt, London ed.). Chicago: Ares Publishers. OCLC 3114020.
- Petrie, Flinders; Mahaffy, J. P.; Milne, J. G.; Lane-Poole, S. (1905). A History of Egypt, Volume I. From the Ist to the XVIth Dynasties. London: Methuen & Co. OCLC 27060979.
- Altenmüller, Hartwig (2001). "Fifth Dynasty". In Redford, Donald B. (ed.). The Oxford Encyclopedia of Ancient Egypt, Volume 2. Oxford University Press. ISBN 978-0-19-510234-5.
- Rice, Michael (1999). Who is who in Ancient Egypt. Routledge London & New York. ISBN 978-0-203-44328-6.
- Roth, Silke (2001). Die Königsmütter des Alten Ägypten von der Frühzeit bis zum Ende der 12. Dynastie. Ägypten und Altes Testament. Vol. 46. Wiesbaden: Harrassowitz. ISBN 978-3-447-04368-7.
- Shaw, Ian, ed. (2000). The Oxford History of Ancient Egypt. Oxford University Press. ISBN 978-0-19-815034-3.
- Strudwick, Nigel (2005). Texts from the Pyramid Age. Society of Biblical Literature, annotated edition. ISBN 978-1-58983-138-4.
- Tabikha, Kamal (July 31, 2022). "Egyptologists unearth remains of ancient sun temple believed to have been lost". Middle East News Agency.
- Verner, Miroslav (1982). "Excavations at Abusir. Season 1980/1981 - Preliminary Report". Zeitschrift für ägyptische Sprache und Altertumskunde. 109: 75–78. doi:10.1524/zaes.1982.109.1.157. S2CID 201700039.
- Verner, Miroslav (1997). "Further thoughts on the Khentkaus problem" (PDF). Discussions in Egyptology. Vol. 38. pp. 109–117. ISSN 0268-3083.
- Verner, Miroslav (1999). Die Pyramiden (in German). Rowohlt, Reinbek. ISBN 978-3-499-60890-2.
- Verner, Miroslav (2000). "Who was Shepseskara, and when did he reign?". In Bárta, Miroslav; Krejčí, Jaromír (eds.). Abusir and Saqqara in the Year 2000 (PDF). Prague: Academy of Sciences of the Czech Republic, Oriental Institute. pp. 581–602. ISBN 978-80-85425-39-0. Archived from the original (PDF) on 2011-02-01.
- Verner, Miroslav (2001). "Archaeological Remarks on the 4th and 5th Dynasty Chronology" (PDF). Archiv Orientální. 69 (3): 363–418.
- Verner, Miroslav (2002). The Pyramids: The Mystery, Culture, and Science of Egypt's Great Monuments. Grove Press. ISBN 978-0-8021-3935-1.
- Verner, Miroslav (2003). Abusir: The Realm of Osiris. The American University in Cairo Press. ISBN 978-977-424-723-1.
- von Beckerath, Jürgen (1997). Chronologie des pharaonischen Ägypten (in German). Münchner ägyptologische Studien, Band 46, Verlag Phillip von Zabern in Wissenschaftliche Buchgesellschaft. ISBN 978-3-8053-2310-9.
- von Beckerath, Jürgen (1999). Handbuch der ägyptischen Königsnamen (in German). Münchner ägyptologische Studien, Heft 49, Mainz : Philip von Zabern. ISBN 978-3-8053-2591-2.
- Wright, Jonathan (June 5, 2008). "Eroded pyramid attributed to early pharaoh" (Press release). Reuters. Archived from the original on June 12, 2018.

Preceded by Neferefre (most likely) or Neferirkare Kakai	King of Egypt c. 2458 BC	Succeeded by Nyuserre Ini (most likely) or Neferefre
