= Giza writing board =

Ancient Egyptian artefact

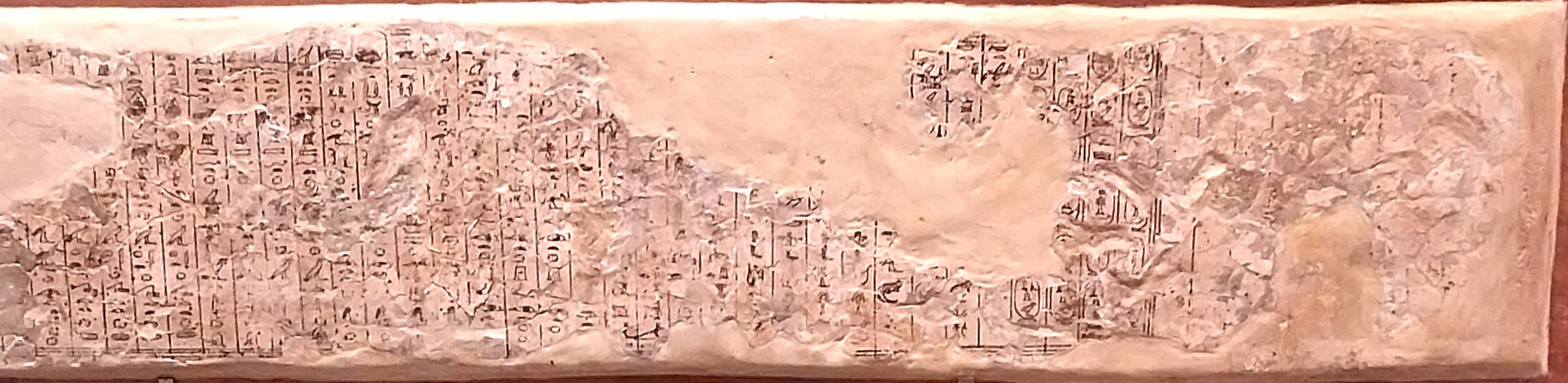
- Part of the Giza writing board
- Material: Cedar wood and Gypsum
- Created: c. 2345 BC
- Discovered: 1904; Giza, Giza Governorate, Egypt
- Discovered by: George Reisner

The Giza writing board (also named Giza king list) is an ancient Egyptian artefact created during the late Fifth Dynasty (c. 2494 – c. 2345 BCE) or early Sixth Dynasty (c. 2345 – c. 2181 BCE). It was found in the burial place of a high official, Mesdjerw, and his wife, Hetep-neferet. The Giza writing board is also known today under the name Giza king list, because it presents a short list of six pharaohs from different dynasties. Mesdjerw held the titles of Confidant of the king, Inspector of the auditioners of the treasure house and Overseer of the gold storages.

== Description ==
The Giza writing board was made of polished cedar wood and gypsum. The original size of the board is unknown and cannot be reconstructed due to the damaged state of the artefact: the tablet was broken into pieces by grave robbers and the cedar wood has nearly completely decayed away. Originally, it was made of a thin, wooden board that was covered smoothly with white gypsum. It was inscribed with a vast and detailed list, written with red, green and black ink.

== Inscription ==
=== Overview ===
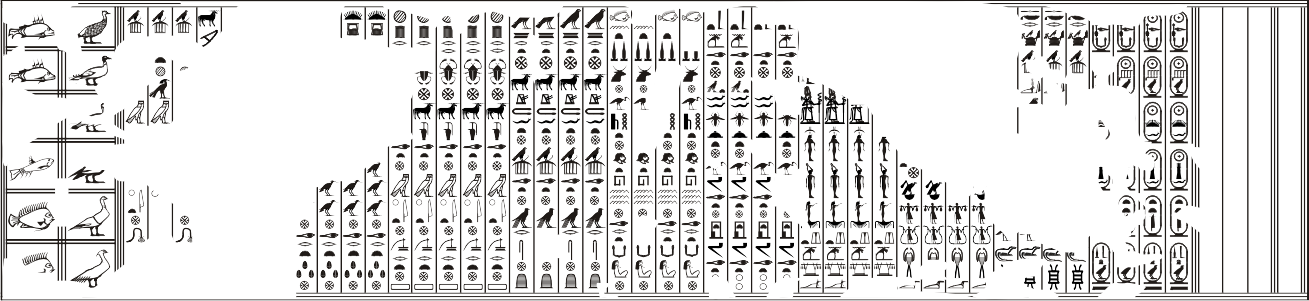
Giza writing board; complete view (after Edward Brovarski's Two Old Kingdom writing boards from Giza, page 52, obj. 1.). From the right to the left: empty columns (first four rows), king list (following four rows), deity list (12 rows), domain list (27 rows) and the sacrificial animals (in boxes).

The list was divided into five "chapters", each separated by three thicker strokes. The first two chapters were meant to contain a text, but for unknown reasons, these remained empty.

The third chapter contains 43 vertical columns. The first 4 columns contain the famous king list, with six names that are repeated verbatim in every column. Each king list ends with the word Ma'at (here with the meaning "justified"). The next 12 columns contain a list of deities, three different deity groups repeated four times each. The same goes for the remaining 27 columns, which list certain city names. However, the last city group is repeated only three times (which explains the uneven sum of 27 city columns altogether).

The fourth "chapter" is divided into square compartments which contains the depictions of sacrificial birds. The fifth "chapter" is also divided into compartments, this time filled with depictions of sacrificial fishes.

=== King list ===
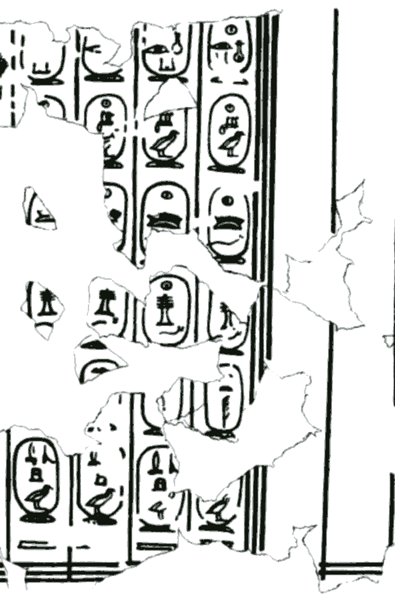
List of kings

The famous king list contains the cartouche names of following kings (from top to bottom):

- Neferirkare Kakai (5th dynasty).
- Sahure (also 5th dynasty).
- Khafre (4th dynasty), builder of the second largest pyramid at Giza.
- Djedefre (also 4th dynasty), first pharaoh using the sun symbol in a royal cartouche.
- Teti (3rd dynasty), commonly identified as Hor-Sekhemkhet.
- Bedjataw (2nd dynasty), commonly identified as king Hor-Hotepsekhemwy.

The list names the kings in reverse chronological order, with the earliest king being the last given. Each column ends with the phrase ma'a, meaning "the justified", which was typical for honouring deceased kings. It may be possible that Mesdjerw participated in the mortuary cult for these kings. This would explain why it was important for him to mention and thus honour only these selected kings.

The cartouche names Bedjataw (or Bedjaw) and Teti are of special interest to Egyptologists. Indeed, the name "Bedjataw" is otherwise only known from the Abydos King List dating to the much later New Kingdom period. According to the position given to it on the list, the name "Teti" seems to designate a king who must have ruled before Djedefre and Khafre. A possible candidate for Teti is Hor-Sekhemkhet, whose nebty name is known from ivory stencils to have been Djeserteti. Hence the Egyptologist Wolfgang Helck has proposed that "Teti" is Sekhemkhet.

=== List of deities ===
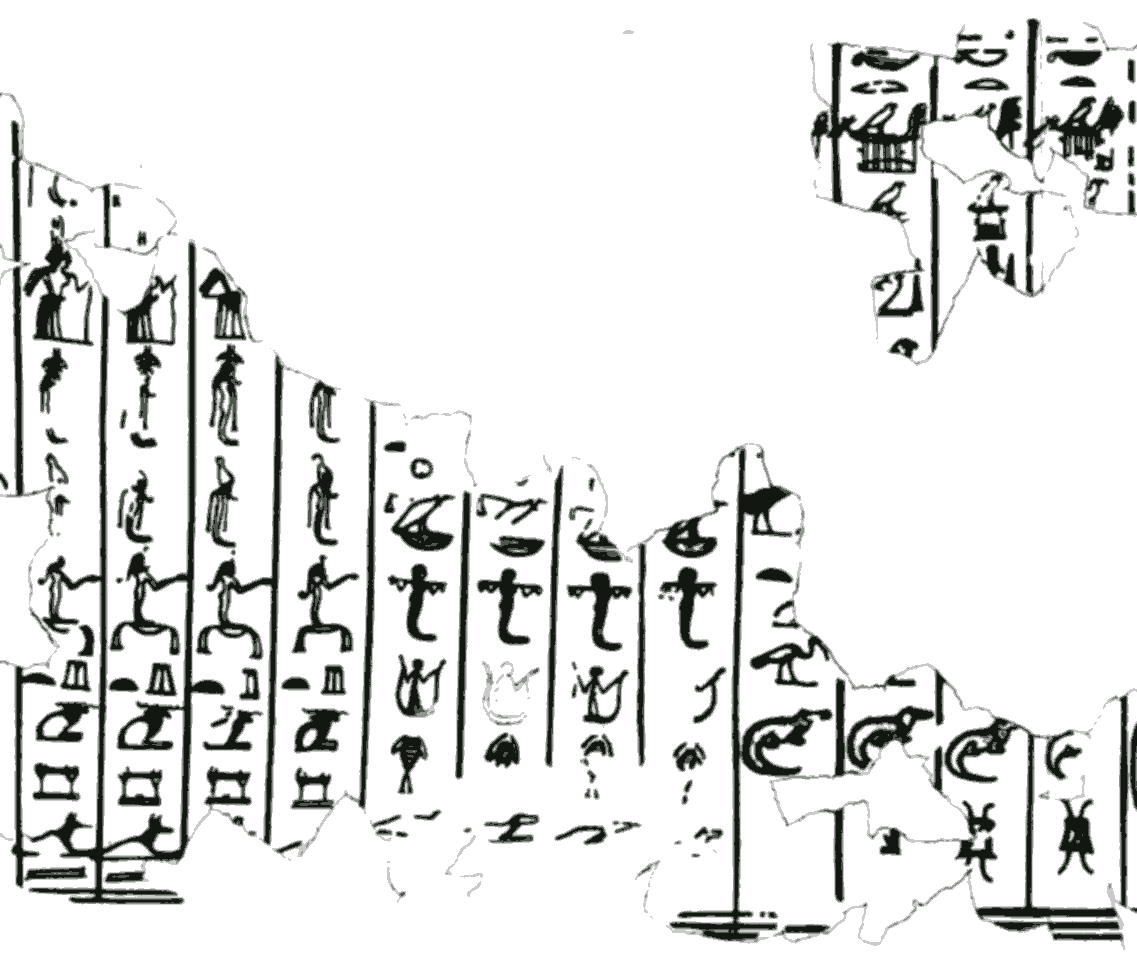
List of deities

The list of deities comprises three fix groups of certain deities, each group is repeated four times, which results in twelve columns altogether. Every group comprises eight deities, there were once 24 gods listed. However, the writing board is heavily damaged in this section, many of the names are lost today.

First group (from top to bottom)

- Seker, god of the underworld. Worshipped since predynastic times.
- Nemty, another underworld deity, also worshipped since predynastic times.
- Sopdu, protector deity of foreign origin, often depicted with one or several captive(s).
- destroyed.
- Horus, god of the sky, safety patron of the pharaohs.
- Geb, earth deity.
- Sak, crocodile god which is seldom mentioned and thus little known.
- Neith, goddess of war and hunting, worshipped since predynastic times.

Second group (top to bottom)

- destroyed.
- destroyed.
- destroyed.
- Nekhbet, throne goddess in shape of a vulture resting on a basket.
- Shezmu, seldom mentioned deity. He was the god of the wine, the gardeners and the dancers. A party god.
- Qis, a deity of sumerian origin, worshipped since protodynastic times. He is shown holding two giraffes or lions in each hand.
- Selket, goddess of protection and health. Her heraldic animal is the scorpion.
- Sobek, crocodile god of the Nile and the swamps. He evoked and controlled the yearly life-spending Nile inundation.

Third group (top to bottom)

- destroyed.
- Min, god of potence and fertility. His idol is an erect phallus. He was worshipped since predynastic times.
- Onuris, god of war and expeditions. He is shown in Asiatic wardrobes with knotted hair, yellow-ish skin and a long, lush beard.
- Seshat, goddess of building, founding and measuring. She was worshipped since Early dynastic period.
- Osiris-Khontamenty, god of the underworld. He is the godlike judge of the court of the dead.
- Meret, seldom mentioned goddess of dancing, luck and joy. She is depicted standing on a gold collar and clapping her hands rhythmically.
- Kherty, god of the underworld. He welcomes the deceased ones and guides them safely to the court of the dead.
- Anubis, jackal-headed god of grieve, mummification and burials. He was worshipped since Early dynastic times.

=== Domain list ===
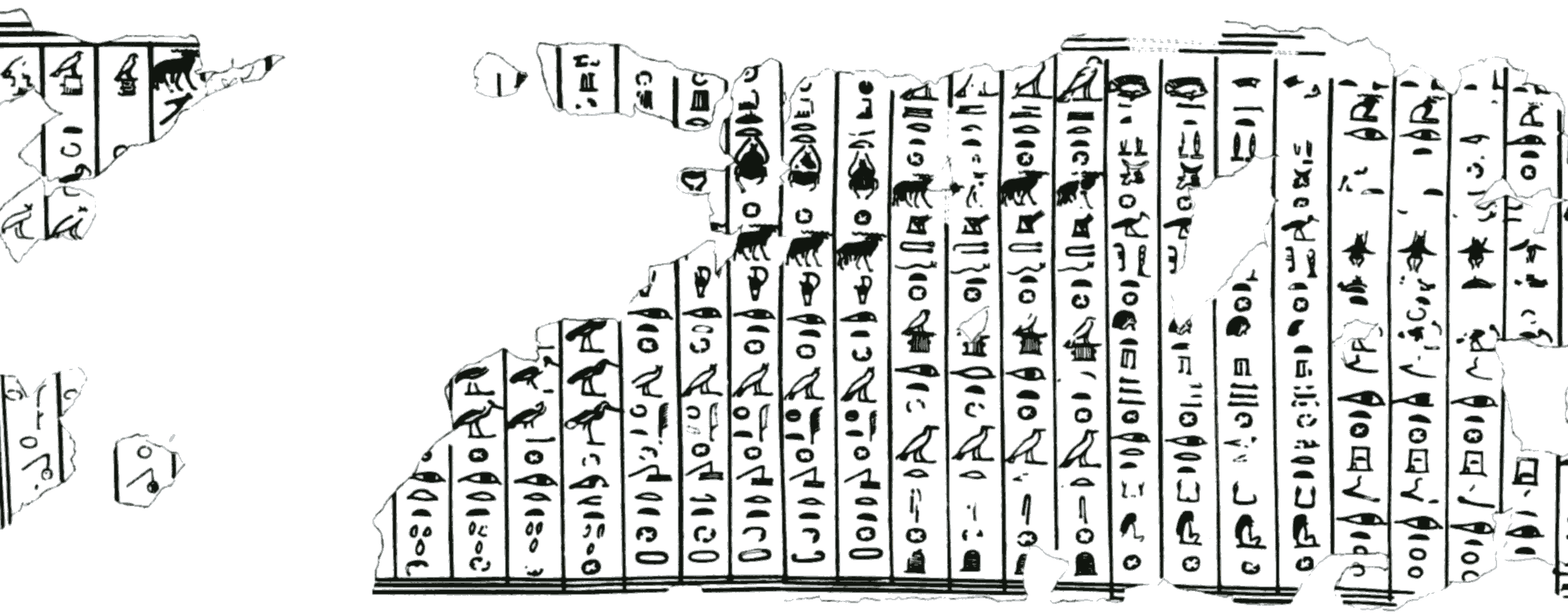
List of domains and places

The domain list comprises 28 cities and domains. Some of these domains are well known to Egyptologists, because their names were found in numerous Old Kingdom tombs throughout Giza (but also at Saqqara). Others are devoted to certain gods, such as the cities Iret-Nemty ("where Nemty works") and Tefet-Khnum ("where they gather together for Khnum"). Another city, Tenmet afefi ("hill of the flies") is of particular interest, because it shows by far the earliest hieroglyph of a house fly.

=== Sacrifice lists ===
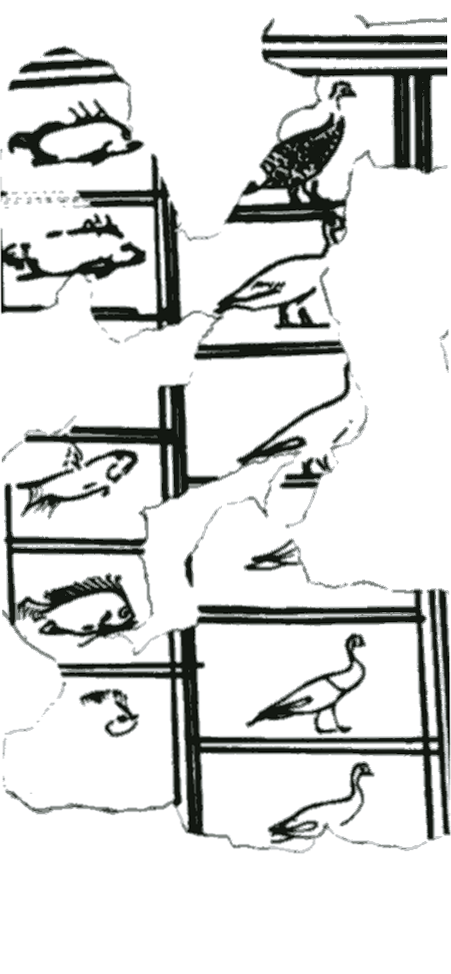
List of sacrificial animals

The first sacrifice list comprises six birds, most of them goose and duck species. However, despite the detailed and naturalistic drawings, it remains difficult to Egyptologists and ornithologists to identify some of the depicted species. The first bird can be identified as a Sennar guineafowl. This bird is known in hieroglyphic writings as Neh-bird, its signs stands for "being attentive" or "being vigilant". The fourth bird might be a greylag and the penultimate bird may be a pintail duck.

The second sacrifice list comprises three species of fish, each species repeated twice (which makes a total sum of six fish depictions). The first species can be identified as a Nile perch, the second one is some kind of carp species. The third fish can be identified as a Nile Tilapia.

== Discovery ==
The writing board was found in 1904 by American Egyptologist George Andrew Reisner in chamber "C" of Mesdjerw's tomb (mastaba G-1011) at Giza. The tomb was badly damaged by grave robbers. Mesdjerw's name and titles were found on a loosened door jamb, the writing board was scattered across the sandy floor.

== Function ==
The exact function of the Giza writing board remains unclear. In normal cases, royal scribes used such writing boards for calligraphic and dictional practices. Or they used them as blueprints for later relief decorations. However, the hieroglyphic design and the depictions of the animals on the Giza writing board are way too detailed and professionally exercised to be a simple blueprint or writing test. For this reasons, some scholars think it was possible that Mesdjerw created his writing board as some kind of notebook for the afterlife. Such things were similar to the offering stelae inside tomb chambers of royal officials, and their popularity grew during the New Kingdom period. Old Kingdom examples, however, are extremely rare, and in case of the Giza writing board unique in its design.

== See also ==
- Karnak king list
- Aegyptiaca
- Palermo Stone
- Saqqara Tablet
- Turin King List
