= Rawer =

Rawer can refer to:

- an ancient Egyptian prince of the 4th Dynasty, son of Kaemsekhem
- Rawer (5th Dynasty), ancient Egyptian official of the 5th Dynasty
- Rawer (vizier), ancient Egyptian official of the 6th Dynasty
- Karl Rawer (1913–2018), German physicist

== See also ==
- Raw (disambiguation)
- Rauer (disambiguation)
