= Rauer =

Rauer may refer to:

- 10025 Rauer, a main-belt asteroid, named after Heike Rauer (born 1961)
- Rauer Islands, a group of islands located in Prydz Bay, Antarctica

== People ==
- Evi Rauer (1915–2004), an Estonian actress
- Georg Rauer (1880–1935), an Austrian violin maker
- Rudolf Rauer (1950–2014), a German handball player
- Stephanie Rauer (born 1979), a German ice dancer
- Thomas Rauer (born 1977), a German ice dancer

== See also ==
- Rawer (disambiguation)
