= Paule Posener-Kriéger =

French egyptologist

Paule Violette Posener-Kriéger (18 April 1925 - 11 May 1996) was a French Egyptologist who was director of the Institut français d'archéologie orientale from 1981 to 1989. While in Abusir, she excavated the pyramid complex of Neferefre where she discovered the Abusir Papyri, a significant ensemble of documents dating to the later Fifth Dynasty of Egypt which she translated, a pioneering work for which she is best known. While in Abusir, she also unearthed several statues of the pharaoh Neferefre, among the best examples of royal statuary of the Fifth Dynasty.

In 1960 she married another French Egyptologist, Georges Posener, who died in 1988. She survived him eight years, dying in 1996. Her obituary was written by Jean Yoyotte.
