= Washptah =

Ancient Egyptian official

- Vizier of Egypt
- Tenure: c. 2470 BC
- Pharaoh: Kakai
- Burial: Mastaba D38, Saqqara, Egypt
- Children: 1 son

Washptah, with the second name Izi, (fl. c. 2470 BC) was an ancient Egyptian official in the Fifth Dynasty under king Neferirkare Kakai. His most important title was that of a vizier, making him to the most important official at the royal court, only second to the king. Next to the office of the vizier he hold several other important positions, including overseer of the scribes of the king's document and overseer of all royal works.

Washptah is mainly known from his mastaba in North Saqqara. It was recorded by Gaston Maspero who assigned to it the number D38. In his tomb is recorded a biographical inscription that reports that Washptah visited a building site of king Neferirkare, he got ill and the king was sending physicians for help. The text is not well preserved so that several details remain unclear. It seems that Washptah died and the king took care of building a tomb and a funerary cult. The inscription was made by the eldest son of Washptah.

== Literature ==
- Breasted, James Henry (1906). Ancient records of Egypt historical documents from earliest times to the persian conquest, collected edited and translated with commentary, Volume I - The First to the Seventeenth Dynasties. Chicago.
- Mariette, Auguste; Maspero, Gaston (1889). Les mastabas de l'Ancien Empire: Fragment du dernier ouvrage de A. Mariette, publié d'après le manuscrit de l'auteur. Paris. OCLC 46226552.
- Nunn, John (1996). "Ancient Egyptian Medicine". Transactions of the Medical Society of London. 113. London: 57–68. ISBN 0-7141-0981-9. PMID 10326089.
- Strudwick, Nigel (1985). The Administration of Egypt in the Old Kingdom: The Highest Titles and Their Holders (PDF). Studies in Egyptology. London; Boston: Kegan Paul International. ISBN 978-0-7103-0107-9. Archived from the original (PDF) on 2014-04-03.
