= Abusir Papyri =

Papyri from ancient Egypt

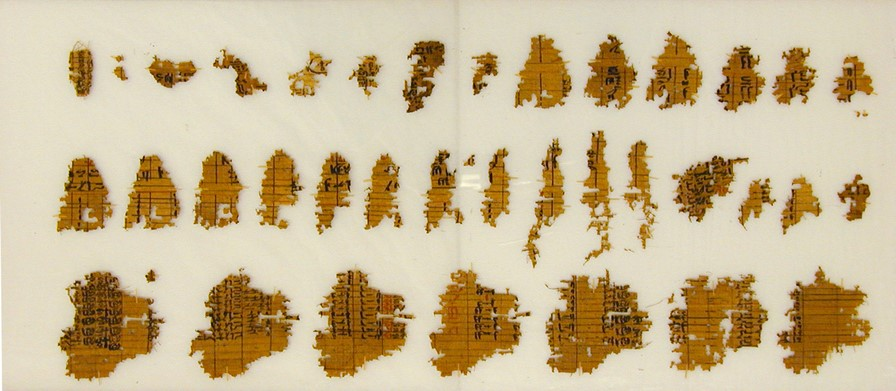
- Fragments of an Abusir papyrus
- Created: 24th century BC
- Discovered: 1893; Egypt

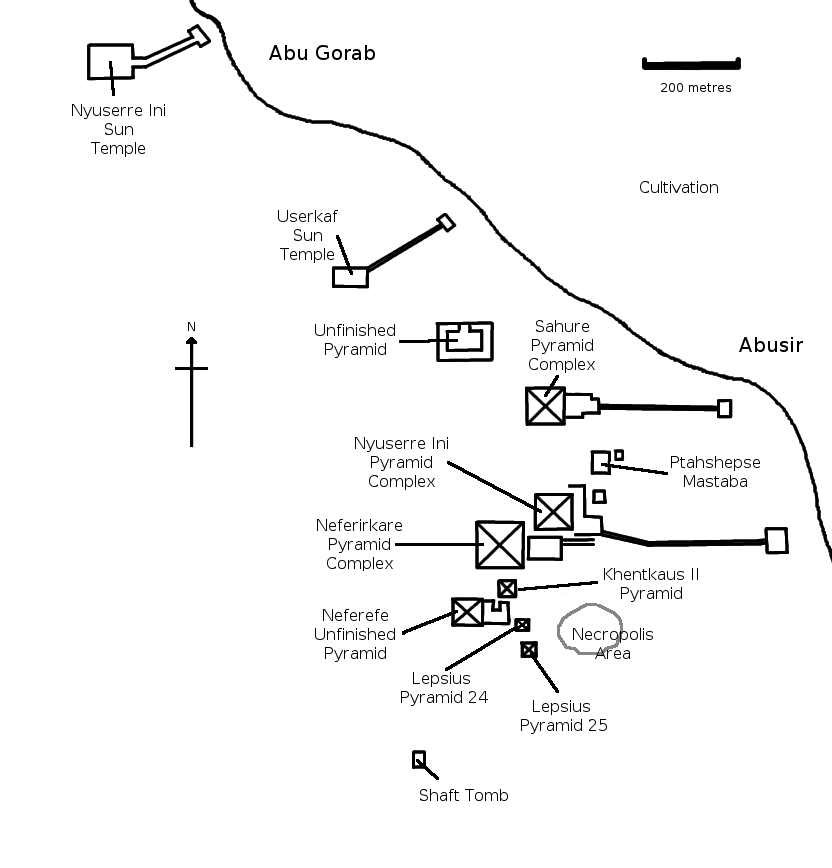
Overview of the locations of the different findings around the Abusir necropolis

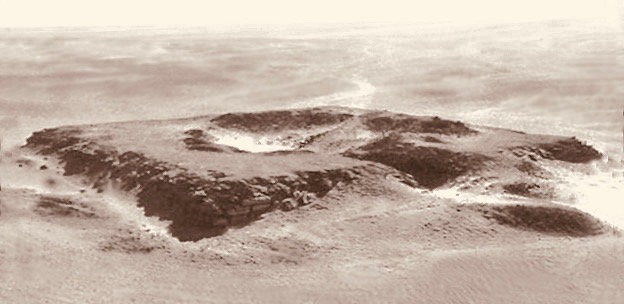
The unfinished Pyramid of Neferefre at Abusir

The Abusir Papyri are the largest papyrus findings to date from the Old Kingdom in ancient Egypt. The first papyri were discovered in 1893 at Abu Gorab near Abusir in northern Egypt. Their origins are dated to around the 24th century BC during the Fifth dynasty of Egypt, making them, even though often badly fragmented, among some of the oldest surviving papyri to date. Later on, a large number of additional manuscript fragments were discovered in the area.

== Contents ==
The Abusir papyri are considered the most important finds of administrative documents from the Old Kingdom. They give detailed information about the running of a royal mortuary temple and include duty rosters for priests, inventories of temple equipment, and lists of daily offerings to the two solar temples at Abu Gorab, north of Abusir, as well as letters and permits. The fragments bear the remains of two different writings.

The introduction is written in hieroglyphs and begins with a date (dates at that time were expressed in the number of national cattle-counts) referring to the reign of Djedkare Isesi, thus dating the manuscripts near the end of the Fifth Dynasty.

The fragmented papyri are written in columns divided into three horizontal registers.

- the first register lists dates and names of officials
- the second register lists names of recipients
- the third register lists the kind of meat cuts supplied; this section is largely destroyed

The hieratic text on the right summarizes allocations of grain.

== History ==
The Abusir Papyri are a collection of administrative papyri dating to the 5th dynasty. The papyri were found in the temple complexes of Neferirkare Kakai, Neferefre and queen Khentkaus II.

The first fragments of the Abusir papyri were discovered in 1893 during illegal excavations at Abusir. They contained manuscripts with regards to Neferirkare Kakai and were subsequently sold to various Egyptologists and museums. German Egyptologist Ludwig Borchardt later identified the find location to near the pyramid temple of the Fifth Dynasty king Neferirkare. This theory was confirmed by Borchardt's discovery of more fragments during excavations at the temple. The papyri from Neferirkare Kakai's complex were found in storerooms located in the southwestern part of the complex.

Based on information in the first Abusir Papyri, in the mid-1970s, Czech archeologists under the leadership of Miroslav Verner were able to find the funerary monument of Neferefre with an additional 2,000 separate pieces of papyri. They were mainly located in the storage rooms in the northwest section of the structure. There is evidence that the papyri originally were fastened with leather straps and stored in wooden boxes.

Further excavations by the Czech expedition on the site also discovered papyri at the funerary monument of Khentkaus (the mother of Khentkaus II).

In addition to the extensive excavations in the Abusir pyramid field conducted by the Czech Institute of Egyptology of the Charles University since the 1970s, the Institute of Egyptology of Waseda University started excavations at the site in September 1990.

== See also ==
- List of ancient Egyptian papyri
