= Georg Rauer =

Austrian violin maker

Georg Rauer (1880, Vienna – 1935, Vienna) was a Viennese violin maker.

He studied under Karel Haudek (Karl (Carl) Haudek, Karl (Carl) Haudeck, Karel Houdek; 1721, Dobříš–1802), later employed by Gabriel Lemböck (1814, Buda–1892, Vienna). Rauer passed his “Gesellenprüfung” in 1897, and went “auf der Waltz” to Budapest. He worked for master Wilhelm Thomas Theodor Jaura before opening his own shop. He was one of the best Viennese violin makers of this period and was also very well known as a dealer of the expensive instruments. Later he taught Karel Josef Dvořák. Instruments made by Georg Rauer have a warm, powerful sound with great depth of tone.

His instruments are generally marked G.R. / Georg Rauer / Geigenmacher in Wien Anno 19..

Czech cellist Petr Nouzovský plays a Georg Rauer 1921 cello.
