= Rawer (5th Dynasty) =

Rawer (fl. c. 2480 BC) was an important ancient Egyptian official at the royal in the Fifth Dynasty in the reign of king Neferirkare Kakai and perhaps under king Sahure. He is known from several sources but mainly from his monumental mastaba at Giza. Rawer had several important titles, many of them related to the wardrobe of the king. His titles included royal hairdresser, overseer of the royal ornament and director of the kilt. Rawer is most famous for a short biographical inscription discovered in his tomb. The text reports that king Neferirkare appeared at a ritual called taking the prow-rope of the god's boat. At this event the staff of the king crossed the way of Rawer who touched that staff by accident and might have stumbled and therefore interrupted the ritual although the text is not clear at this point. The king immediately said be healthy. The text reports further that the event was written down and copied into the tomb of Rawer.

The mastaba was a huge burial complex that was found heavily destroyed. Especially remarkable is the high number of statues found. Otherwise little is known about Rawer. In the funerary temple of king Sahure is depicted asole friend Rawer. He might be identical to the official buried at Giza. Little is known about his family. His father was called Ites, his mother Hetepheres. Two children are known, a daughter called Hetepheres and a son called Rawer.

== Literature ==
- Allen, James P. (1992). "Re-wer's accident". In Lloyd, Alan B. (ed.). Studies in Pharaonic Religion and Society, in honour of J. Gwyn Griffiths. London: The Egyptian Exploration society. pp. 14–20. ISBN 0856981206.
- Borchardt, Ludwig (1913). Das Grabdenkmal des Königs S'aḥu-Re (Band 2): Die Wandbilder: Text. Leipzig.
- Hassan, Selim (1932). Excavations at Giza 1929 - 1930. Oxford: The Egyptian University.
