= Maa Kheru =

Ancient Egyptian phrase

U5 a Aa1 r E23 P8 A2 im t P8 t
mꜣꜥ-ḫrw ("True of Voice")
in hieroglyphs

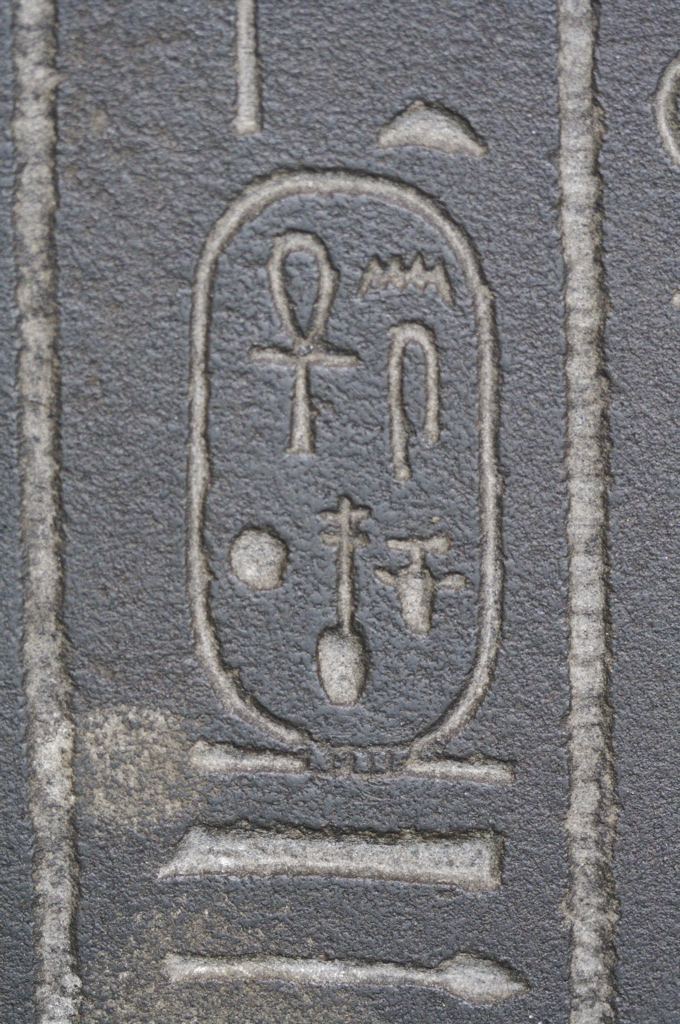
Cartouche of Ankhnesneferibre, with the phrase Maa Kheru just below it.

Maa Kheru (Ancient Egyptian: mꜣꜥ ḫrw) is a phrase meaning "true of voice" or "justified" or "the acclaim given to him is right". The term is involved in ancient Egyptian afterlife beliefs, according to which deceased souls had to be judged morally righteous. Once the soul had passed the test, the Weighing of the Heart, they were judged to be mꜣꜥ ḫrw and allowed to enter the afterlife.

The phrase was often used to denote someone who had died and become a god, placed after the name of the individual in question. As such, it is frequently found in inscriptions in Egyptian tombs and royal mortuary temples, especially as part of an introductory clause for autobiographical inscriptions celebrating the tomb or temple owner's achievements in life.

== See also ==
- Maat, the Egyptian concept of truth, order, and justice (from the same root)
