= Menkauhor Kaiu =

Pharaoh of Egypt

- Mencherês, Menkaouhor, Ikau, Ikaouhor, Hor-A-Kau
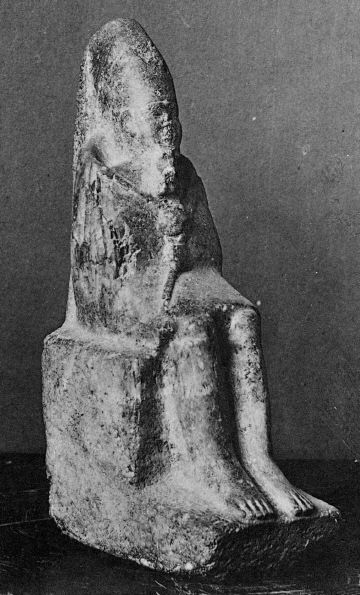
- Statue of Menkauhor wearing the dress of the Sed festival from Memphis (Note: The statue is now in the Egyptian Museum and has the catalog numbers CG40 and JdE 28579.)

Pharaoh
- Reign: Eight to nine years of reign in the late-25th to early-24th century BC. (Note: Proposed dates for Menkauhor's reign: 2444–2436 BC, 2422–2414 BC, 2421–2414 BC, 2414–2405 BC, 2389–2380 BC, 2373–2366 BC)
- Predecessor: Nyuserre Ini
- Successor: Djedkare Isesi
Royal titulary
Horus name
Menkhau
Mn-ḫ3w
Horus, He whose appearances are eternal
Alternative translation:
Established of appearances
G5	Y5 N28 G43
Golden Horus
Bik-nebu Hedj
Bik-nbw ḥḏ
The effulgent Golden Falcon
Alternative translation:
The radiant Golden Falcon
T3 G8
Prenomen
Menkauhor
Mn-k3w-Ḥr
Eternal are the Kas of Horus
Alternative translation:
The established one of the Kas of Horus
M23 t L2 t < G5 Y5 D28 D28 D28 >
Turin canon:
Menkahor
Mn-k3-Ḥr
The Ka of Horus
< G5 G7 Y5 n D28 Z1 G7 > G7
Saqqara Tablet:
Menkahor
Mn-k3-Ḥr
The Ka of Horus
< G5 Y5 D28 >
Abydos king list:
Menkauhor
Mn-k3w-Ḥr
Eternal are the Kas of Horus
< G5 Y5 D28 D28 D28 >
Nomen
Ikauhor
Ik3w-Ḥr
The Ka of Horus
G39 N5 < G5 i D28 w >
Variant form:
Kaiu
Ik3w
The Ka [of Horus]
G39 N5 < D28 i w >
- Consorts: Uncertain: Khuit I, Meresankh IV
- Children: Conjectural: Raemka ♂, Khaemtjenent ♂
- Father: Uncertain, possibly Neferefre or, less likely, Nyuserre Ini
- Mother: Possibly Khentkaus III
- Burial: Headless Pyramid
- Monuments: Sun temple Akhet-Ra; Pyramid Netjer-isut-Menkauhor/Ikauhor
- Dynasty: Fifth Dynasty

Menkauhor Kaiu (also known as Ikauhor and in Greek as Mencherês, Μεγχερῆς) was an Ancient Egyptian pharaoh of the Old Kingdom period. He was the seventh ruler of the Fifth Dynasty at the end of the 25th century BC or early in the 24th century BC (c. 2399–2390 BC).

Menkauhor ruled for eight or more likely nine years, following king Nyuserre Ini, and was succeeded in turn by Djedkare Isesi. Although Menkauhor is well attested by historical sources, few artefacts from his reign have survived. Consequently, his familial relation to his predecessor and successor is unclear, and no offspring of his have been identified. Khentkaus III may have been Menkauhor's mother, as indicated by evidence discovered in her tomb in 2015.

Beyond the construction of monuments, the only known activity dated to Menkauhor's reign is an expedition to the copper and turquoise mines in Sinai. Menkauhor ordered the construction of a sun temple, called the "Akhet-Ra", meaning "The Horizon of Ra". The last to be built, this sun temple, known from inscriptions found in the tombs of its priests, is yet to be located. Menkauhor was buried in a small pyramid in Saqqara, which the Ancient Egyptians named Netjer-Isut Menkauhor, "The Divine Places of Menkauhor". Known today as the Headless Pyramid, the ruin had been lost under shifting sands until its rediscovery in 2008.

The figure of Menkauhor was at the centre of a long lasting funerary cult until the end of the Old Kingdom period, with at least seven agricultural domains producing goods for the necessary offerings. The cult of a deified Menkauhor, then known by the titles "Strong Lord of the Two Lands, Menkauhor the Justified" reappeared during the New Kingdom period (c. 1550 – c. 1077 BC), and lasted until at least the Nineteenth Dynasty (c. 1292 – c. 1077 BC), some 1200 years after his death.

== Attestations ==
=== Historical ===
Menkauhor is attested by three hieroglyphic sources, all from the much later New Kingdom period. His name is given on the 31st entry of the Abydos King List, which was inscribed on the walls of a temple during the reign of Seti I (1290–1279 BC). He is also mentioned on the Saqqara Tablet (30th entry) and on the Turin canon (third column, 23rd row), both of which were written during the reign of Ramesses II (1279–1213 BC). The Turin canon credits Menkauhor with a reign of eight years. These sources indicate that Menkauhor succeeded Nyuserre Ini and preceded Djedkare Isesi on the throne, making him the seventh pharaoh of the Fifth Dynasty.

Menkauhor was likely mentioned in the Aegyptiaca, a history of Egypt written in the 3rd century BC during the reign of Ptolemy II (283–246 BC) by the Egyptian priest Manetho, but no copies of the text survive, and it is known only through later writings by Sextus Julius Africanus and Eusebius. Africanus relates that the Aegyptiaca mentioned a pharaoh "Mencherês" reigning for nine years as the seventh king of the Fifth Dynasty. Mencherês is believed to be a Hellenized form of Menkauhor, and Africanus' nine-year figure fits well with the eight years of reign given to Menkauhor on the Turin canon, the latter figure being considered by some Egyptologists, including Hartwig Altenmüller, as more likely than the former. However, Menkauhor likely ruled for 9 years since:

" the higher attestations we have [for this king] are a year 7 [531x/I/82-a1, a2] and a year after the year 7 [763x/I/82]. They come from jar labels from Raneferef[s'] funeral temple in Abusir. In addition, a year after the 1st census is also attested [for Menkauhor], which means we can estimate the length of Menkauhor's reign to be at least 9 yrs, possibly as many as 15 years."

=== Contemporaneous ===
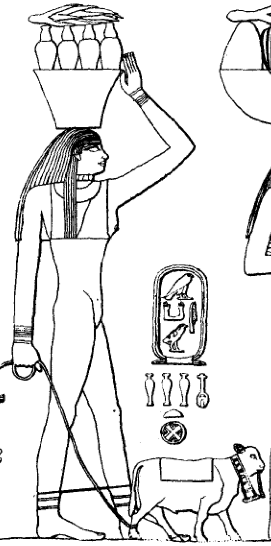
Personified agricultural estate of Menkauhor, tomb of Ptahhotep, Saqqara

Relatively few attestations dating to Menkauhor's reign have survived compared to the other kings of the Fifth Dynasty. Nonetheless, Menkauhor's name is well attested in the names and titles of priests and officials of the Fifth Dynasty as well as in the names of the agricultural estates associated with his funerary cult. Surviving artefacts contemporaneous with Menkauhor's reign include two stone vessels inscribed with his name from the mortuary temple of Neferefre – possibly gifts from Menkauhor for the funerary cult of Neferefre– as well as a few sealings from the same temple and from an area known as "Djedkare's Family Cemetery" in Abusir. Cylinder seal impressions showing Menkauhor's Horus name or the name of his pyramid have also been unearthed in the mortuary complex of Nyuserre Ini, and in the necropolises of Giza and Gebelein.

A gold cylinder seal bearing Menkauhor's cartouche as part of the name of his pyramid together with the serekh of Djedkare Isesi is now on display at the Museum of Fine Arts, Boston. (Note: The golden seal has the catalog number 68.115.) The seal, purportedly discovered near the Pactolus river valley in western Anatolia, could attest to wide-ranging trade-contacts during the Fifth Dynasty, but its provenance remains unverifiable. (Note: The archaeologist Karin Sowada has even doubted the authenticity of the seal.)

The only secure depiction of the king dating to the Old Kingdom that has survived to this day is a rough, possibly unfinished, alabaster statuette showing Menkauhor enthroned and wearing the tight-fitting ceremonial robe of the Heb-sed. (Note: Measuring 47.5 cm (18.7 in) in height, the statue shows the king wearing the white crown of Upper Egypt, his eyes adorned with Kohl and with a now damaged false beard. Menkauhor is identified by an inscription at the right of the feet giving his name.) The statue was discovered in a cachette built during the late New Kingdom beneath the floor of a room to the west of the sacred lake at the temple of Ptah in Memphis. The Egyptologist Jocelyn Berlandini proposed that another statuette, (Note: The statuette is now in the Egyptian Museum of Cairo, under the catalog number JE 39013.) usually attributed to Teti, belongs instead to Menkauhor Kaiu. Berlandini bases her hypothesis on stylistic grounds, noting the resemblance with Menkauhor's seated statue, as well as the location of the second statue, which was uncovered east of Teti's pyramid, in close proximity to Menkauhor's pyramid.

Monumental attestations of Menkauhor are limited to a rock inscription at the Wadi Maghareh in Sinai, showing his titulary and a rough stele inscribed with his cartouche from Mastaba 904 at Saqqara.

== Family ==
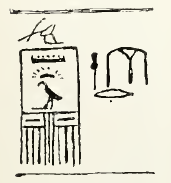
Drawing of a serpentine cylinder seal of Menkauhor Kaiu

=== Name ===
The name of Menkauhor is a departure from those of other kings of the Fifth Dynasty. Menkauhor, whose name means "Eternal are the Kas of Horus", is the first pharaoh in 80 years whose name does not refer to the sun god Ra. The name of Menkauhor instead finds its peers among the princes of the Fifth Dynasty with, for example, prince Khentykauhor "The forces of Horus are at the fore", a son of Nyuserre Ini, and prince Neserkauhor, a son of Djedkare Isesi.

=== Filiation ===
Owing to the paucity of contemporaneous sources for Menkauhor, his relation to his predecessor, Nyuserre Ini, and to his successor, Djedkare Isesi, cannot be ascertained beyond doubt. Menkauhor may have been a son of Nyuserre Ini; indeed Nyuserre Ini is known to have fathered a prince Khentykauhor as shown by a relief mentioning the prince from the mortuary complex of queen Khentkaus II, the mother of Nyuserre Ini. The similarity of Khentykauhor's name to that of Menkauhor led the Egyptologists Miroslav Verner and Vivienne Callender to propose that the two are the same person, with Khentykauhor taking the name "Menkauhor" upon ascending the throne. This hypothesis is possibly contradicted by an inscription discovered in 2008 in the mastaba of Werkaure, the eldest son of an unnamed king. The inscription mentions a "Menkauhor", but does not ascribe any royal attributes to him. The Egyptologists Hana Vymazalová and Filip Coppens suggest this might refer to the future pharaoh Menkauhor Kaiu at a time when he was still a prince. They note that Menkauhor might have offered high-quality stone blocks for the construction of the tomb of his (possible) relative, which would explain the inscription. This contradicts the identification of Menkauhor with Khentykauhor; Vymazalová and Coppens theorize that Khentykauhor and Menkauhor were brothers and sons of Nyuserre Ini.

The identity of Menkauhor's mother is equally uncertain. In January 2015 the tomb of the "King's wife" and "King's mother", Khentkaus III, was discovered by a team of Czech archaeologists in the necropolis surrounding the pyramid of Neferefre in Abusir. Mud seals in the tomb indicate that Khentkaus III was buried during Nyuserre Ini's reign. Since Nyuserre Ini's own mother is known to have been Khentkaus II, the discovery suggests that she was Menkauhor Kaiu's mother. The position of her tomb close to the pyramid of Neferefre could indicate that she was this king's consort and thus that Neferefre was Menkauhor's father.

=== Consorts ===
No queen consort of Menkauhor has been identified for certain. The Egyptologist Wilfried Seipel has proposed that Khuit I was a queen of Menkauhor. Based on the dating of the tombs surrounding Khuit's burial, Seipel argues that she lived during the mid-Fifth Dynasty. By the process of elimination, he attributes known queens to each king of the period, which leaves only Menkauhor as a candidate for her king. These arguments are criticized by the Egyptologist Michel Baud, who observes that pharaohs could have had more than one queen.

Queen Meresankh IV has also been suggested as a consort for Menkauhor based on the dating and location of her tomb in Saqqara. (Note: Meresankh IV is buried in the tomb S82.) It is possible however that she was a wife of Djedkare Isesi.

=== Descendants ===
There is no evidence either for or against the hypothesis that Menkauhor's successor Djedkare Isesi was his son. Two sons have been suggested for Menkauhor based on the dating and general location of their tombs in Saqqara: princes Raemka (Note: Prince Raemka was buried in the tomb S80.) and Kaemtjenent, (Note: Prince Kaemtjenent was buried in the tomb S84.) both believed to be children of Meresankh IV. By the same reasoning, they could instead be sons of Djedkare Isesi.

== Reign ==
=== Duration ===
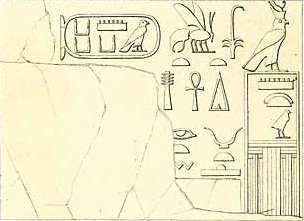
Relief of Menkauhor Kaiu from the Wadi Maghareh (Note: The inscription reads "Horus Menkhau, king of Upper and Lower Egypt Menkauhor, given life, stability, and [dominion for ever]. A commission carried out by ...". The inscription is now housed in the Egyptian Museum, Cairo, under the catalog number JE 38566.)

Given the scarcity of contemporaneous attestations for Menkauhor, modern Egyptologists consider his reign to have been perhaps eight or nine years long, as indicated by the much later historical sources. The small seated statue of Menkauhor wearing the robe of the Sed festival might suggest a longer reign, since this festival was typically celebrated only after a ruler had spent 30 years on the throne. However, Egyptologist Hartwig Altenmüller deems this hypothesis unlikely. Mere depictions of the festival do not necessarily imply a long reign; for example, a relief showing pharaoh Sahure in the tunic of the Sed festival was found in his mortuary temple, although both historical sources and archaeological evidence suggest Sahure ruled Egypt for less than 14 full years.

=== Activities ===
Owing to the scarcity of artefacts and inscriptions relating to Menkauhor's reign, few of his activities are known. Menkauhor sent an expedition to Sinai to exploit the mines of turquoise and copper in the Wadi Maghareh. The expedition is evidenced by a damaged rock inscription showing Menkauhor's titulary which is one of the few attestations dating to his lifetime. The mines of Sinai had been exploited since the Third Dynasty (2686 BC–2613 BC), and both Menkauhor's predecessor Nyuserre Ini and successor Djedkare Isesi sent expeditions to the Wadi Maghareh.

== Construction activities ==
Menkauhor Kaiu is known to have ordered the construction of two major monuments during his reign: a sun temple for the veneration of Ra and a pyramid for his burial, known today as the "Headless Pyramid".

=== Sun temple ===
Sun temple of Menkauhor in hieroglyphs
N5 G25 Aa1 t N17 O25 (Note: The last hieroglyph shown here is an approximation of the correct one which shows a squat obelisk on a flat base called a ben-ben.)
3ḫ.t-Rˁ
Akhet-Ra

Following a tradition which started with Userkaf, the founder of the Fifth Dynasty, Menkauhor built a temple to the sun god Ra. He was the last pharaoh to do so. His successors, Djedkare Isesi and Unas, abandoned this practice as the cult of Ra declined at the expense of that of Osiris. Given the paucity of documents relating to Menkauhor's sun temple, it probably functioned for only a short time or was never completed.

Menkauhor's sun temple was called Akhet-Ra, which is variously translated as "The Horizon of Ra" or "The Place where Ra Issues Forth". The temple has yet to be located and could be lying under the sands of Saqqara or Abusir. Its existence is known thanks to inscriptions found in the tombs of Fifth and Sixth Dynasties officials who served as priests of Ra in the temple. These include Hemu, buried in Giza, and Neferiretptah and Raemankh, who were both buried in Saqqara-north. In addition to his service in the Akhet-Ra, Neferiretptah was a priest in Menkauhor's pyramid and held the office of "royal ornament", making him responsible for the precious items in the palace of the king.

Besides these inscriptions, a single seal (Note: The seal is now in the Egyptian Museum of Berlin with catalog number 16760) bearing the name of the Akhet-Ra is known from the tomb of princess Khamerernebti, located near the mortuary temple of Niuserre in Abusir. The seal was placed on a large vessel indicating that provisions for the tombs of members of the royal family were dispatched from Menkauhor's temple to Niuserre's pyramid complex.

=== Pyramid ===
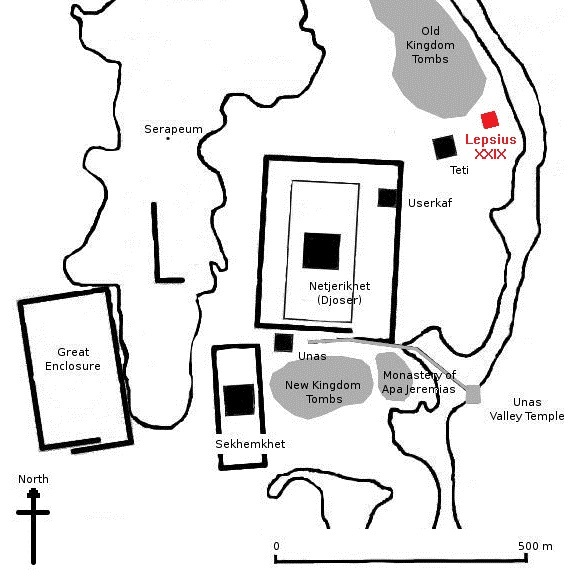
The pyramid of Menkauhor (Lepsius XXIX) was constructed on a south-west north-east axis linking the pyramids of Djoser and Userkaf and, after Menkauhor's death, those of Unas and Teti as well.

Menkauhor Kaiu built a pyramid in North-Saqqara, thereby abandoning the royal necropolis of Abusir, where kings of the Fifth Dynasty had been buried since the reign of Sahure, some 80 years earlier. The reason for this choice may be that the Abusir plateau had become overcrowded by the beginning of Menkauhor's reign.

Originally named Netjer-isut-Menkauhor by the Ancient Egyptians, meaning "The divine places of Menkauhor", the pyramid is known today as Lepsius XXIX after the number given to it by the archaeologist Karl Richard Lepsius who discovered the pyramid in 1843. Owing to the ruined state of the structure, it is known in Arabic as the "Headless Pyramid", a name that has been retained. The pyramid was lost under shifting sands in the early 20th century and its attribution to Menkauhor was consequently debated. Instead, it was proposed that the Headless Pyramid was that of Merikare, a structure dating to the First Intermediate Period and which has yet to be found. In 2008, the structure identified by Lepsius was rediscovered by a team of archaeologists under the direction of Zahi Hawass, and excavations at the site quickly established a Fifth Dynasty date as indicated by the construction techniques used in its making. Although the excavations failed to yield the name of the king who built the pyramid, Menkauhor was the last pharaoh of the dynasty whose pyramid remained undiscovered. Thus, proceeding by elimination, archeologists and egyptologists have formally recognized the Headless Pyramid as that of Menkauhor.

The pyramid is estimated to have been around 50–60 m (160–200 ft) at the base, so that the edifice would have stood 40–50 m (130–160 ft) high at the time of its construction, making it one of the smallest royal pyramids of the Old Kingdom. (Note: As compared to the dimensions of the other royal pyramids of the Old Kingdom as given by Grimal.) There is evidence that Menkauhor had the time to complete his pyramid, whose small dimensions are thus consistent with his short eight to nine years of reign.

On the north side lies the entrance to the underground chamber system, which was sealed by two granite portcullises indicating that a burial took place. A broken sarcophagus lid of blue-grey basalt was found in the burial chamber by Cecil Mallaby Firth during his brief excavations of the pyramid in 1930.

== Funerary cult ==
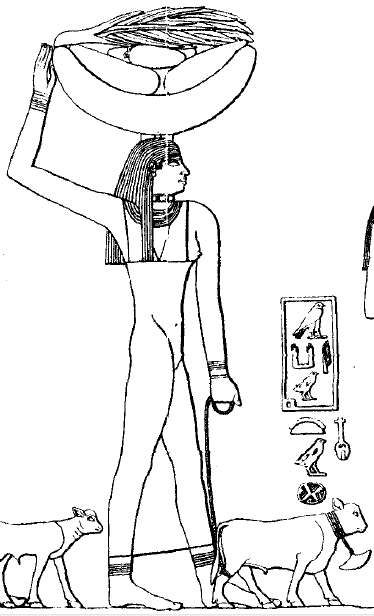
Personified Ḥwt domain of Menkauhor called "Menkauhor is perfect of appearances", tomb of Ptahhotep.

=== Old Kingdom ===
After his death Menkauhor enjoyed a funerary cult centered on his pyramid complex. The cult lasted at least until the second half of the Sixth Dynasty, nearly 150 years later. Provisions for this cult were produced in dedicated agricultural domains that were established during Menkauhor's lifetime. Products of these domains were delivered to Menkauhor's sun and mortuary temples and distributed to the priests of the cult, who could use them for their sustenance or their own funerary cults. Personified representations of Menkauhor's agricultural domains are depicted bringing offerings on the walls of the mastabas of these priests. Most of the depictions are located in Saqqara North, near the pyramid complex of Djoser. This area comprises the tombs of Neferiretptah, Raemankh, Duare, Iti, Sekhemnefer, Snofrunefer, Akhethotep, Ptahhotep and Qednes, all priests of the funerary cult of Menkauhor. Further tombs of priests of this cult are found to the north, in Abusir South, with the mastaba of Isesiseneb and Rahotep and in Giza.

The complete names of at least seven domains of Menkauhor are known: "Ikauhor is perfect in favor" (Note: In Egyptian Nfr-ḥswt Ik3w-Ḥr reading "Neferhesut Ikauhor".) and "the favor of Ikauhor", (Note: In Egyptian Ḥswt Ik3w-Ḥr reading "Hesut Ikauhor".) both mentioned in the tombs of Ptahhotep and Akhethotep; "Ikauhor is perfect of life", (Note: Nfr-ˁnḫ Ik3w-Ḥr Neferankh Ikauhor.) from the tomb of Ptahhotep II; "Horus Qemaa causes Ikauhor to live"; (Note: Sˁnḫ Ḥr-ḳm3ˁ Ik3w-Ḥr reading "Sankh Hor-Qemaa Ikauhor".) "Ikauhor is strong"; (Note: W3ḥ Ik3w-Ḥr that is "Wah Ikauhor" also translated "Ikauhor flourishes".) "Seshat loves Ikauhor" (Note: Mr-Sš3t Ik3w-Ḥr reading "Mer Sheshat Ikauhor".) and "Matyt loves Ikauhor" (Note: Mr-M3tjt Ik3w-Ḥr for "Mer Matyt Ikauhor", Matyt is possibly a variant for "Matit", a lioness goddess worshipped during the Old Kingdom period in Deir el-Gabrawi.) from the tombs of viziers Senedjemib Inti, Senedjemib Mehi and Hemu in Giza. In addition the Ḥwt domain of the king, which comprises the land holdings of the mortuary temple of Menkauhor, was named "Menkauhor is perfect of appearances". (Note: Ḥwt nfr-ḫ3w Mn-k3w-Ḥr reading "Hewet neferkhau Menkauhor".)

=== New Kingdom ===
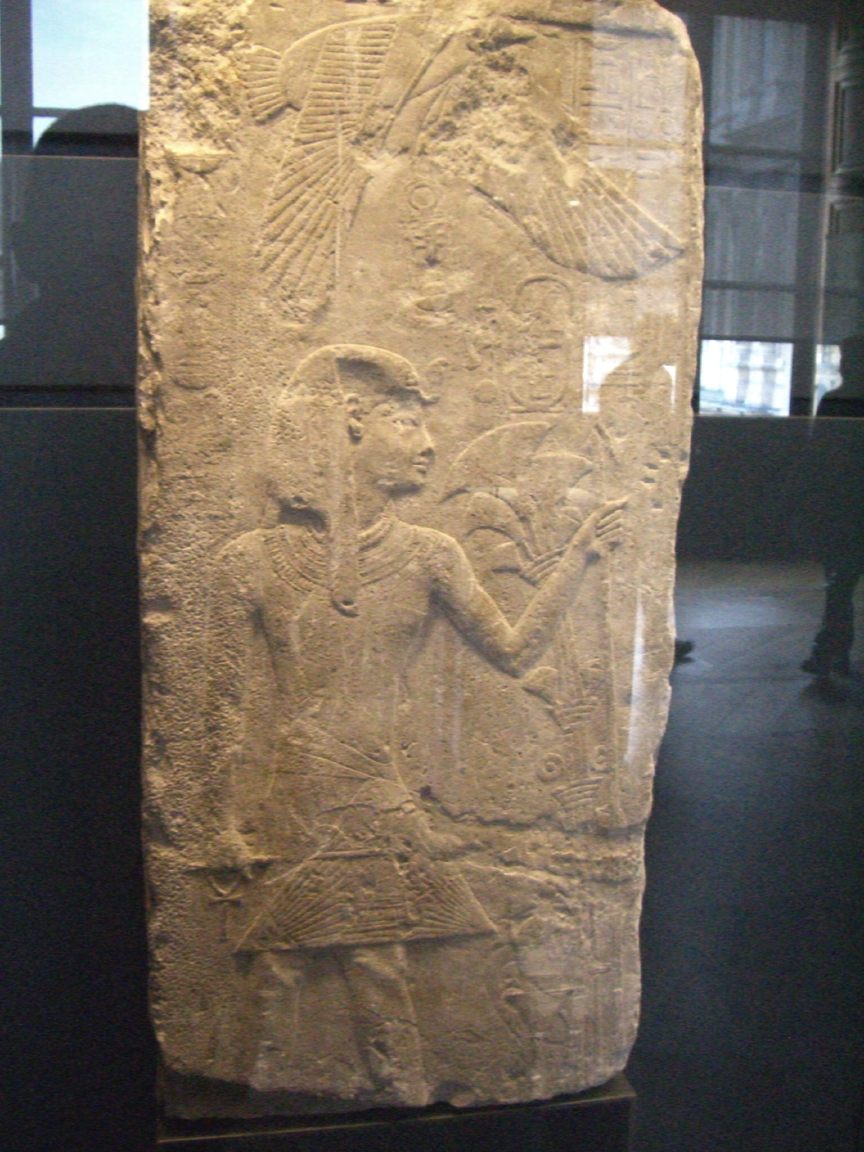
Menkauhor represented on a stele from the tomb of Ameneminet, Louvre

The cult of Menkauhor enjoyed a revival during the New Kingdom period (1550–1077 BC). At this point Menkauhor had been deified as a local god of the Saqqara necropolis acting as a divine intercessor, and qualified of "Strong Lord of the Two Lands, Menkauhor the Justified". (Note: Title found in the tomb of Thuthu, in Egyptian wsir nb t3wy Mn-k3w-Ḥr m3ˁ ḫrw.) This cult is evidenced by reliefs showing Menkauhor in the tombs of the "Chief of the artisans and jewelers" Ameneminet and of the physician Thuthu in Saqqara-North, both of whom lived at the time of the late Eighteenth Dynasty (1550–1292 BC), during the reigns of Tutankhamun, Ay and Horemheb.

An inscribed block dating to the later Ramesside period (1292–1077 BC) and now in the Egyptian Museum of Berlin, (Note: The relief has the catalog number Berlin NI 1116.) was uncovered by Lepsius in a house in Abusir and shows Menkauhor enthroned beside four other deified kings of the Old Kingdom: the name of the first, partially lost, but probably Sneferu is then followed by Djedefre, Menkaure, Menkauhor and finally Neferkare. The owner of the tomb stands before the kings, in worship. Another relief dating to the same period shows a similar scene. It was inscribed on the lintel of the tomb chapel of Mahy buried in Saqqara North. Four deified kings of the Old Kingdom are shown, all of whom built their pyramids at Saqqara: Djoser, Teti, Userkaf and Menkauhor.

The persistence of the cult of Menkauhor during the late Eighteenth to Nineteenth Dynasty possibly results from the location of his pyramid, which stood on the way to the necropolis of the Apis bulls, which later became the Serapeum.

== See also ==
- List of pharaohs

== Bibliography ==
- Altenmüller, Hartwig (2001). "Old Kingdom: Fifth Dynasty". In Redford, Donald B. (ed.). The Oxford Encyclopedia of Ancient Egypt, Volume 2. Oxford University Press. pp. 597–601. ISBN 978-0-19-510234-5.
- Baker, Darrell (2008). The Encyclopedia of the Pharaohs: Volume I — Predynastic to the Twentieth Dynasty 3300–1069 BC. Stacey International. ISBN 978-1-905299-37-9.
- Bard, Kathryn (2015). An Introduction to the archaeology of ancient Egypt. John Wiley & Sons, Inc. ISBN 978-0-470-67336-2.
- Bárta, Miroslav; Černý, Viktor; Strouhal, Eugen (2001). Abusir V. The Cemeteries at Abusir South I. Excavations of the Czech Institute of Egyptology. Prague: Roman Míšek. ISBN 978-80-86277-18-9.
- Baud, Michel (1999). Famille Royale et pouvoir sous l'Ancien Empire égyptien. Tome 2 (PDF). Bibliothèque d'étude 126/2 (in French). Cairo: Institut français d'archéologie orientale. ISBN 978-2-7247-0250-7. Archived from the original (PDF) on 2015-04-02.
- von Beckerath, Jürgen (1999). Handbuch der ägyptischen Königsnamen (in German). Münchner ägyptologische Studien, Heft 49, Mainz : Philip von Zabern. ISBN 978-3-8053-2591-2.
- Berlandini, Jocelyne (1979). "La pyramide ruinée de Sakkara-nord et le roi Ikaouhor-Menkaouhor". Revue d'Égyptologie (in French). 31. La Société Française d'Égyptologie: 3–28.
- Berlandini-Grenier, Jocelyne (1976). "Varia Memphitica I". Bulletin de l'Institut Français d'Archéologie Orientale (in French). 76. Le Caire: Institut français d'archéologie orientale: 301–316.
- Borchardt, Ludwig (1911). Statuen und Statuetten von Königen und Privatleuten im Museum von Kairo, Nr. 1-1294. Catalogue Général des Antiquités Égyptiennes du Musée du Caire (in German). Vol. 1. OCLC 7012471.
- Borchardt, Ludwig (1913). Das Grabdenkmal des Königs S'aḥu-Re (Band 2): Die Wandbilder: Abbildungsblätter (in German). Leipzig: Hinrichs. ISBN 978-3-535-00577-1.
- Brewer, Douglas J.; Teeter, Emily (1999). Egypt and the Egyptians. Cambridge, New York: Cambridge University Press. ISBN 978-0-521-44518-4.
- Brovarski, Edward (2001). Der Manuelian, Peter; Simpson, William Kelly (eds.). The Senedjemib Complex, Part 1. The Mastabas of Senedjemib Inti (G 2370), Khnumenti (G 2374), and Senedjemib Mehi (G 2378). Giza Mastabas. Vol. 7. Boston: Art of the Ancient World, Museum of Fine Arts. ISBN 978-0-87846-479-1.
- "Czech expedition discovers the tomb of an ancient Egyptian unknown queen". Charles University in Prague. 16 January 2015.
- Clayton, Peter (1994). Chronicle of the Pharaohs. Thames & Hudson. ISBN 978-0-500-05074-3.
- Dodson, Aidan; Hilton, Dyan (2004). The Complete Royal Families of Ancient Egypt. London: Thames & Hudson Ltd. ISBN 978-0-500-05128-3.
- Dorman, Peter (2015). "The 5th dynasty (c. 2465–c. 2325 bc)". Encyclopædia Britannica Online.
- Firth, Cecil Mallaby (1930). "Report on the excavations of the Department of antiquities at Saqqara (November 1929–April 1930)". Annales du Service des Antiquités de l'Égypte. 30: 185–189.
- Fischer, Henry George (1962). "The Cult and Nome of the Goddess Bat". Journal of the American Research Center in Egypt. 1: 7–18. doi:10.2307/40000855. JSTOR 40000855.
- Gardiner, Alan; Peet, Eric; Černý, Jaroslav (1955). The inscriptions of Sinai. London: Egypt Exploration Society. OCLC 699651.
- Gardiner, Alan (1959). The Royal Canon of Turin. Griffith Institute. OCLC 21484338.
- Goelet, Ogden (1999). "Abu Gurab". In Bard, Kathryn (ed.). Encyclopedia of the Archaeology of Ancient Egypt. London; New York: Routledge. ISBN 978-0-203-98283-9.
- Grimal, Nicolas (1992). A History of Ancient Egypt. Translated by Ian Shaw. Oxford: Blackwell publishing. ISBN 978-0-631-19396-8.
- Hornung, Erik; Krauss, Rolf; Warburton, David, eds. (2012). Ancient Egyptian Chronology. Handbook of Oriental Studies. Leiden, Boston: Brill. ISBN 978-90-04-11385-5. ISSN 0169-9423.
- Jacquet-Gordon, Helen (1962). Les noms des domaines funéraires sous l'ancien empire égyptien (in French). Le Caire : Imprimerie de l'Institut français d'archéologie orientale. OCLC 18402032.
- Kanawati, Naguib (2003). Conspiracies in the Egyptian Palace: Unis to Pepy I. London; New York: Routledge. ISBN 978-0-203-16673-4.
- Kaplony, Peter (1981). Die Rollsiegel des Alten Reichs II. A : Katalog der Rollsiegel. Monumenta Aegyptiaca n°3. Bruxelles: Fondation égyptologique reine Élisabeth. OCLC 490611856.
- Lehner, Mark (1997). The Complete Pyramids. London: Thames & Hudson. ISBN 978-0-500-05084-2.
- Leprohon, Ronald J. (2013). The Great Name: Ancient Egyptian Royal Titulary. Writings from the Ancient World, no. 33. Atlanta: Society of Biblical Literature. ISBN 978-1-58983-736-2.
- Lepsius, Karl Richard (1846–1856). Denkmäler aus Ägypten und Äthiopien, Abteilung I: Topographie & Architektur (in German). Berlin. OCLC 60700892.
- Lepsius, Karl Richard (1846–1856). Denkmäler aus Ägypten und Äthiopien, Abteilung II Band III: Altes Reich (in German). Berlin. OCLC 60700892.
- Malek, Jaromir (1994). "King Merykare and his Pyramid". In Berger, C.; Clerc, G.; Grimal, Nicolas (eds.). Hommages à Jean Leclant. Vol. 4. Bibliothèque d'étude 106/4. Cairo: Institut français d'archéologie orientale. pp. 203–214. ISBN 978-2-7247-0139-5.
- Malek, Jaromir (2000). "The Old Kingdom (c.2160–2055 BC)". In Shaw, Ian (ed.). The Oxford History of Ancient Egypt. Oxford University Press. ISBN 978-0-19-815034-3.
- Mariette, Auguste (1864). "La table de Saqqarah". Revue Archéologique (in French). 10. Paris: 168–186 & Pl. 17.
- Mariette, Auguste (1889). Maspero, Gaston (ed.). Les Mastabas de l'Ancien Empire, Fragments du Dernier Ouvrage d'Auguste Édouard Mariette (in French). Paris: Friedrich Vieweg. OCLC 2654989.
- Morales, Antonio J. (2006). "Traces of official and popular veneration to Nyuserra Iny at Abusir. Late Fifth Dynasty to the Middle Kingdom". In Bárta, Miroslav; Coppens, Filip; Krejčí, Jaromír (eds.). Abusir and Saqqara in the Year 2005, Proceedings of the Conference held in Prague (June 27–July 5, 2005). Prague: Academy of Sciences of the Czech Republic, Oriental Institute. pp. 311–341. ISBN 978-80-7308-116-4.
- Müller, Karl Otfried, ed. (2010). Fragmenta Historicorum Graecorum, Vol. 2. Cambridge: Cambridge University Press. ISBN 978-1-108-01661-2.
- Mumford, G. D. (1999). "Wadi Maghara". In Bard, Kathryn; Shubert, Steven Blake (eds.). Encyclopedia of the Archeology of Ancient Egypt. New York: Routledge. pp. 875–876. ISBN 978-0-415-18589-9.
- Murray, Margaret Alice (1905). Saqqara Mastabas. Part I (PDF). Egyptian research account, 10th year. London: Bernard Quaritch. OCLC 458801811.
- Petrie, Flinders (1917). Scarabs and Cylinders with Names (PDF). Publications (British School of Archaeology in Egypt), 29. London: School of Archaeology in Egypt. OCLC 3246026.
- Rice, Michael (1999). Who is who in Ancient Egypt. Routledge London & New York. ISBN 978-0-203-44328-6.
- Richter, Barbara (2013). "Sed Festival Reliefs of the Old Kingdom". Paper Presented at the Annual Meeting of the 58th Annual Meeting of the American Research Center in Egypt, Wyndham Toledo Hotel, Toledo, Ohio, Apr 20, 2007. Archived from the original on 25 February 2015.
- Schulman, Alan (1979). "Beyond the fringe. Sources for Old Kingdom foreign affairs". Journal of the Society for the Study of Egyptian Antiquities. 9: 79–104. ISSN 0383-9753.
- "Seal of office". Collections: The Ancient World. Boston Museum of Fine Arts.
- Sowada, Karin N.; Grave, Peter (2009). Egypt in the Eastern Mediterranean during the Old Kingdom: an archaeological perspective. Orbis biblicus et orientalis, 237. Fribourg: Academic Press; Göttingen: Vandenhoeck & Ruprecht. ISBN 9783525534557.
- Seipel, Wilfried (1980). Untersuchungen zu den ägyptischen Königinnen der Frühzeit und des alten Reiches: Quellen und historische Einordnung (PhD). University of Hamburg. OCLC 256076594.
- Strudwick, Nigel C. (2005). Texts from the Pyramid Age. Writings from the Ancient World (book 16). Atlanta: Society of Biblical Literature. ISBN 978-1-58983-680-8.
- Vercoutter, Jean (1992). L'Egypte et la vallée du Nil, 1 : Des origines à la fin de l'Ancien Empire 12000–2000 av. J.-C (in French). Paris: Presses universitaires de France. ISBN 978-2-13-044157-1.
- Verner, Miroslav (1994). Forgotten Pharaohs, Lost Pyramids: Abusir. Praha: Academia Škodaexport. ISBN 978-80-200-0022-4.
- Verner, Miroslav (1995). The Pyramid Complex of Khentkaus. Abusir III. Prague: Charles University. ISBN 978-80-7066-909-9.
- Verner, Miroslav (2000). "Who was Shepseskara, and when did he reign?". In Bárta, Miroslav; Krejčí, Jaromír (eds.). Abusir and Saqqara in the Year 2000 (PDF). Prague: Academy of Sciences of the Czech Republic, Oriental Institute. pp. 581–602. ISBN 978-80-85425-39-0. Archived from the original (PDF) on 2011-02-01.
- Verner, Miroslav (2001a). "Archaeological Remarks on the 4th and 5th Dynasty Chronology" (PDF). Archiv Orientální. 69 (3): 363–418.
- Verner, Miroslav (2001b). "Old Kingdom: An Overview". In Redford, Donald B. (ed.). The Oxford Encyclopedia of Ancient Egypt, Volume 2. Oxford University Press. pp. 585–591. ISBN 978-0-19-510234-5.
- Verner, Miroslav; Callender, Vivienne; Strouhal, Evžen (2002). Djedkare's Family Cemetery (PDF). Abusir VI. Prague: Czech Institute of Egyptology, Faculty of Arts, Charles University. ISBN 978-80-86277-22-6. Archived from the original (PDF) on 2013-04-07.
- Verner, Miroslav (2003). Abusir: The Realm of Osiris. Cairo: The American University in Cairo Press. ISBN 978-977-424-723-1.
- Verner, Miroslav (2013). Temple of the World: Sanctuaries, Cults, and Mysteries of Ancient Egypt. Cairo: The American University in Cairo Press. ISBN 978-977-416-563-4.
- Verner, Miroslav (2014). Sons of the Sun. Rise and decline of the Fifth Dynasty. Prague: Charles University, Faculty of the Arts. ISBN 978-80-7308-541-4. OCLC 909874854.
- Vlčková, Petra (2006). "Inscribed Stone Vessels from the Mortuary Complex of Raneferef at Abusir". Archiv Orientální. 74: 259–270.
- Voß, Susanne (2004). Untersuchungen zu den Sonnenheiligtümern der 5. Dynastie. Bedeutung und Funktion eines singulären Tempeltyps im Alten Reich (PDF) (PhD). OCLC 76555360.
- Vymazalová, Hana; Coppens, Filip (2008). "König Menkauhor. Ein kaum bekannter Herrscher der 5. Dynastie". Sokar (in German). 17: 32–39.
- Vymazalová, Hana; Coppens, Filip (2013). "Two hieratic inscriptions from the tomb of Werkaure (Lepsius Pyramid No. XXIII) in Abusir". In Bárta, Miroslav; Küllmer, Hella (eds.). Diachronic Trends in Ancient Egyptian History: Studies dedicated to the memory of Eva Pardey. Prague: Czech Institute of Egyptology. pp. 123–135. ISBN 978-80-7308-444-8.
- Waddell, William Gillan (1971). Manetho. Loeb classical library, 350. Cambridge, Massachusetts; London: Harvard University Press; W. Heinemann. OCLC 6246102.
- Wildung, Dietrich (1969). "Die Rolle ägyptischer Könige im Bewußtsein ihrer Nachwelt. Teil I. Posthume Quellen über die Könige der ersten vier Dynastien". Münchener Ägyptologische Studien (in German). 17. München–Berlin: Deutscher Kunstverlag.
- Wright, Jonathan (June 5, 2008). "Eroded pyramid attributed to early pharaoh". Reuters (Press release). Archived from the original on June 12, 2018.
- Young, William J. (1972). "The Fabulous Gold of the Pactolus Valley" (PDF). Boston Museum Bulletin. LXX.

Preceded by Nyuserre Ini	Pharaoh of Egypt; Fifth Dynasty	Succeeded by Djedkare Isesi
