= Pyramid of Neferefre =

Unfinished pyramid

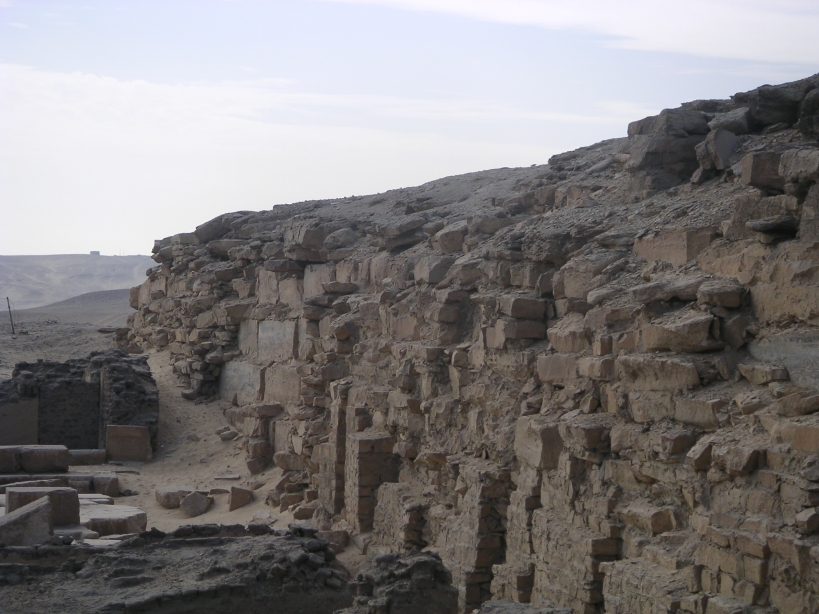

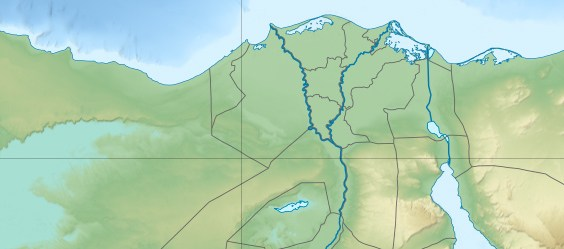
- Location within Lower Egypt
- 29°53′38″N 31°12′6″E
- Owner: Neferefre
Ancient name
< N5 F35 I9 > R8 D21 G30 O24
Nṯrỉ bꜣw Nfr-f-Rꜥ
Netjeri bau Nefer-ef-Re
"Divine is Neferefre's power"
Alternatively translated as "Divine are the Ba's of Neferefre"
- Constructed: Fifth Dynasty
- Type: Smooth-sided pyramid (intended); Square mastaba or Primeval mound (converted)
- Material: Limestone
- Height: ~7 m (23 ft; 13 cu)
- Base: 78 m (256 ft; 149 cu) (intended); 65 m (213 ft; 124 cu) (after mastaba conversion)
- Volume: 29,575 m^{3} (38,683 cu yd)
- Slope: 64°30' (intended); 78° (after mastaba conversion)

The pyramid of Neferefre, or pyramid of Raneferef, (Egyptian: Nṯrỉ bꜣw Nfr-f-Rꜥ, lit. 'Divine is Neferefre's power') is the unfinished funerary monument built for the Egyptian pharaoh Neferefre of the Fifth Dynasty in the 25th century BC. (Note: Proposed dates for the reign of Neferefre: c. 2475–2474 BC, c. 2460–2453 BC, c. 2448–2445 BC, c. 2431–2420 BC, c. 2419–2416 BC, c. 2362–2359 BC.) It is the third and final pyramid built on the Abusir diagonal – a figurative line connecting the Abusir pyramids with Heliopolis – of the necropolis, and is sited south-west of Neferirkare's pyramid.

The pyramid was hastily converted into a square mastaba or primeval mound after Neferefre's early death. In the period between his death and mummification, an improvised, north–south oriented limestone mortuary temple was built on a strip of platform originally intended for the casing of the pyramid. It is unclear who constructed this initial phase of the temple, though clay sealings found in its vicinity suggest that it may have been the ephemeral ruler Shepseskare who commissioned it. During the reign of Nyuserre, Neferefre's younger brother, the temple was expanded twice. In the second phase, built from mudbrick, the temple was significantly extended to the east, a transverse corridor leading to five storage rooms was added, as were ten two-story storage magazines in the northern side of the temple, and, most significantly, a hypostyle hall. It contained twenty-two or twenty-four wooden columns, all lost, and many stone and wooden statues of the ruler, of which fragments have been found. A limestone ka statuette of Neferefre is significant among these statues, as it presents a motif previously only known from a single statue of Khafre. The usual elements of an entrance hall, columned courtyard, and five niche statue temple were forgone, though the entrance hall and columned courtyard were added in during the third phase of construction.

South-east of the mortuary temple, a large rectangular mudbrick building was uncovered. This was revealed to be "the Sanctuary of the Knife", an abattoir which was used for the ritual slaughter of animals as offerings for the mortuary cult. The Abusir Papyri preserve an event where 130 bulls were slaughtered during a ten-day festival. By the reign of Teti in the Sixth Dynasty, the abattoir had been bricked up and decommissioned. The mortuary cult of the king ceased activities after the reign of Pepi II, but was briefly revived in the Twelfth Dynasty. From the New Kingdom to the Nineteenth century, the monument was periodically farmed of its limestone. Despite this, the complex remains one of the best preserved of the Old Kingdom. In its substructure, excavators found fragments of a red granite sarcophagus and of Neferefre's mummy, who was found to have died at around twenty to twenty-three years of age. The mastaba tomb of Khentkaus III, likely Neferefre's wife, was discovered near his unfinished pyramid in Abusir. Inside the substructure fragments of a mummy were recovered, which were determined to belong to a twenty-year-old female. Her name and titles were found recorded on Baugraffiti, including the title "mother of the king". The identity of this king was not found recorded in the epigraphy of her tomb, but most likely refers to either Menkauhor or Shepseskare.

== Location and excavation ==
=== Location ===
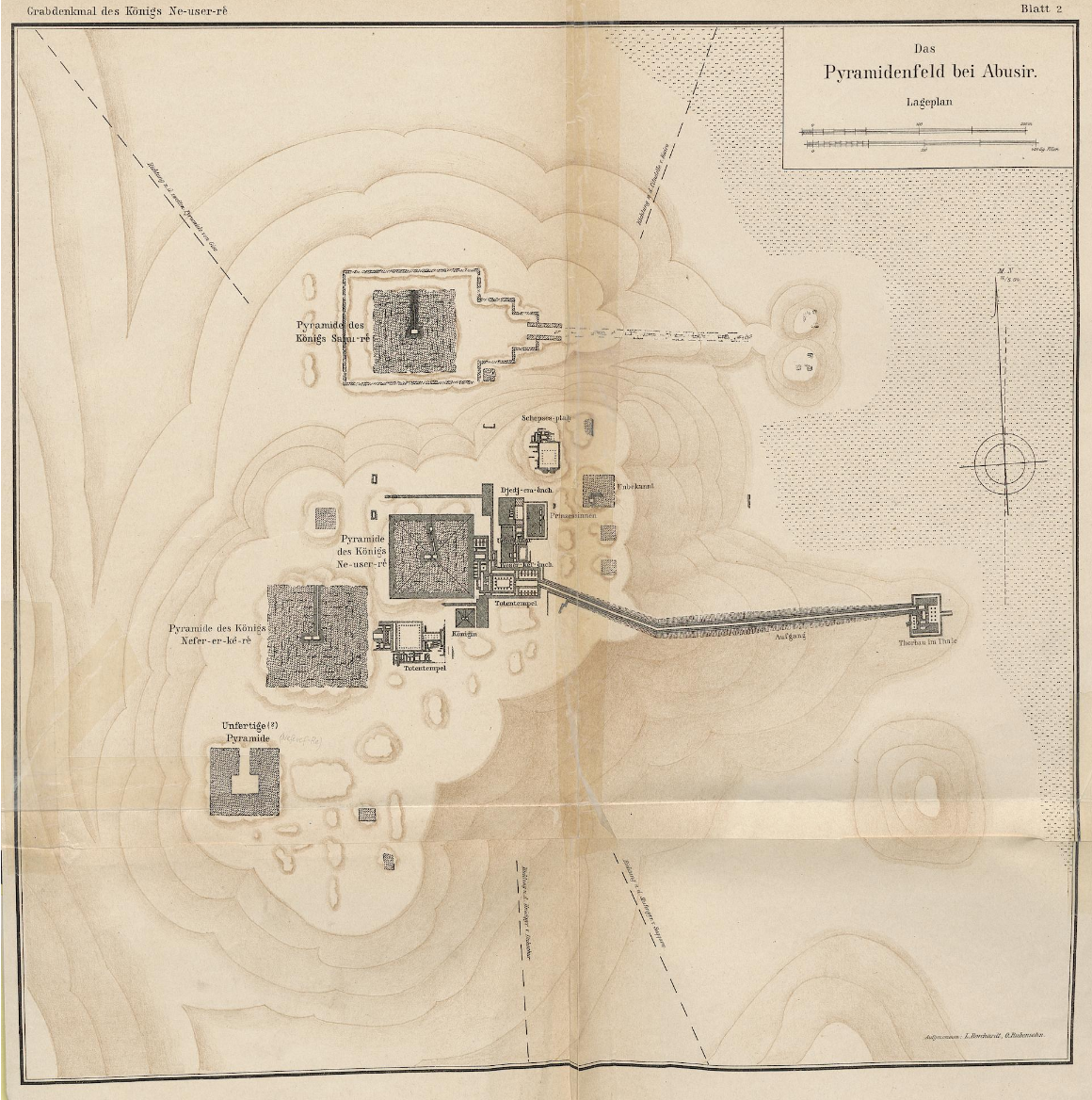
A map of the Abusir necropolis, by L. Borchardt and O. Rubensohn, showing the locations, from north to south, of Sahure's, Nyuserre's, Neferirkare's, and Neferefre's unfinished pyramids

The unfinished pyramid is located south-west of Neferirkare's pyramid in the Abusir necropolis, between Saqqara and the Giza Plateau. It is seated on the Abusir diagonal, a figurative line touching the north-western corners of the pyramids of Sahure, Neferirkare, and Neferefre, and pointing towards Heliopolis (Iunu). It is similar to the Giza diagonal which converges to the same point, except that the Giza pyramids are linked at their south-east corners instead. The siting of Neferefre's pyramid gives an indication of its position on a chronological scale. As the third and final pyramid in line on the Abusir diagonal, it follows that it is the third in line of succession following Sahure and Neferirkare. Similarly, it is the furthest of the three from the Nile delta, and thus held the least advantageous position for material transport. A limestone block, discovered by Édouard Ghazouli in the village of Abusir in the 1930s, depicts Neferirkare with his consort, Khentkaus II, and eldest son, Neferefre, further substantiating the chronology.

=== Early surveys ===
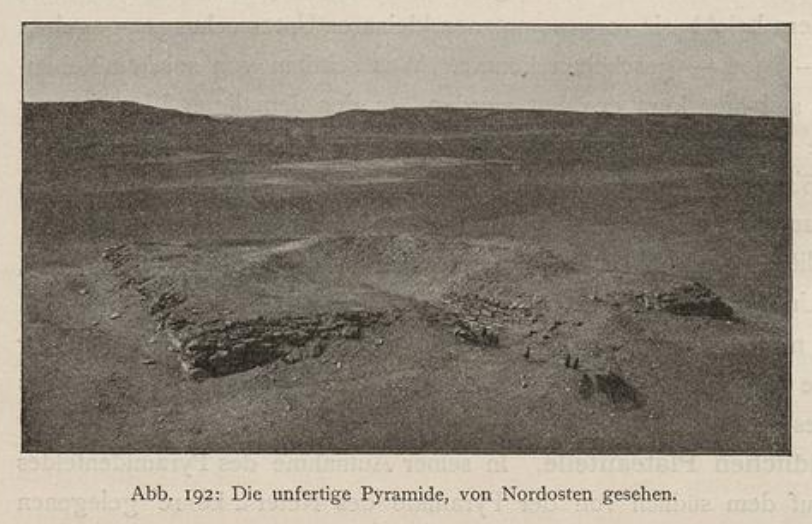
Borchardt's photograph of the pyramid of Neferefre

The building was noticed during the early archaeological studies of the necropolis of Abusir, but not subject to thorough investigation. John Shae Perring (1835–1837), Karl Richard Lepsius (1842–1846), who catalogued the ruins as XXVI in his pyramid list, Jacques de Morgan, and Ludwig Borchardt each gave limited attention to the building.

Borchardt carried out a trial excavation at the site, digging a trench into the open ditch that spanned from the north face of the monument to its center. He anticipated that if the tomb was functional, he would encounter the passage leading to the burial chamber. Substructure passages had north–south orientations pointing to the pole star, where Ancient Egyptians believed that the pharaoh would join Re in the sky and remain in the "heavenly ocean" for all eternity. By contrast the burial- and ante- chambers were oriented east–west, and the mummy itself was placed against the western wall with its head pointed north, but facing east. The experimental dig failed to find the passage, leading Borchardt to conclude that the structure was left incomplete and unused. Either by chance or error, Borchardt abandoned the dig whilst perhaps only 1 m (3.3 ft) away from discovering remnants of the passage. As a consequence of Borchardt's decision, the function of the monument and the identity of its owner remained a mystery for seventy years.

=== Charles University excavations and discoveries ===
A definitive assignment of an owner to the pyramid stump was not possible prior to the 1970s. It was speculatively attributed to Neferefre, or the ephemeral Shepseskare, and it was believed that the structure was abandoned before its completion, excluding the possibility of a burial and, consequently, a mortuary cult. Intensive research of the remains began in 1974, by the Czech team of Charles University in Prague. The owner was identified as Neferefre from a single cursive inscription, written in black on a block taken from the corridor. The archaeological excavations of the Czech team continued throughout the 1980s, coming to a halt in 1998.

== Mortuary complex ==
=== Layout ===
Old Kingdom mortuary complexes typically consist of five main components: (1) a valley temple; (2) a causeway; (3) a mortuary temple; (4) a cult pyramid; and (5) the main pyramid. Neferefre's complex consisted of an unfinished pyramid, comprising a single step that was hastily converted into a mound, and a mortuary temple built in three stages during the reigns of Nyuserre and, possibly, Shepseskare. The valley temple, causeway and cult pyramid were not built.

=== Main pyramid ===
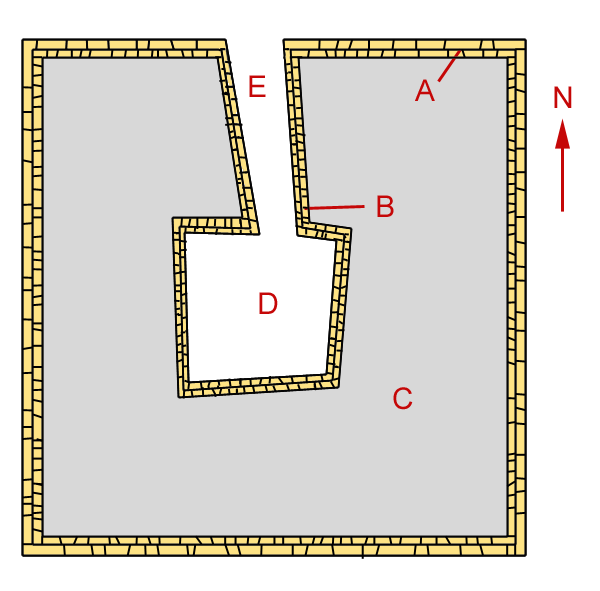
Structure of the single pyramid core step A: External wall B: Internal wall C: Pyramid step fill D: Pit for the underground chambers E: Pit for the entry

The pyramid's condition created the opportunity for a detailed examination of construction methodology employed by pyramid builders in the Fifth and Sixth Dynasties. In particular, the Czech team were able to test Lepsius' and Borchardt's accretion layer hypothesis – the method used in the Third Dynasty – for the construction of Fifth Dynasty pyramids.

After exploring the Abusir necropolis in 1843, Lepsius developed the hypothesis that the Abusir pyramids were built by layering stone blocks at a ~75° angle against a central limestone spindle on the pyramid's vertical axis. Lepsius justified his hypothesis with the idea that it allowed the pharaoh to expand his tomb gradually over the course of his reign, but if this was the case, then there should be a correlation between regnal duration and pyramid size, yet no such relationship exists. Borchardt, who resurveyed the pyramids between 1902 and 1908, further promulgated the theory after discovering what he believed were accretion layers in Sahure's pyramid. His model of the internal structure of Sahure's pyramid, displayed in the Egyptian Museum in Cairo, and his published plans for the Abusir pyramids garnered the hypothesis widespread support. The Egyptologists Vito Maragioglio and Celeste Rinaldi examined several Fourth and Fifth Dynasty pyramids in the 1960s, but failed to find any evidence supporting accretion layers, and instead found horizontal layers in the structures of the pyramids they visited, including Userkaf's and Sahure's. In the 1980s, the Czech Abusir Mission were able to thoroughly examine the internal structure of Neferefre's unfinished pyramid. The single completed step contained no accretion layers, and in Miroslav Verner's opinion, mostly likely none of the other Abusir pyramids did either.

At the pyramid site, builders had the ground levelled, and measures for the construction of the pyramid base taken. A large east–west oriented rectangular trench was excavated to form the basis of the pyramid's funerary apartments, and a deep north–south oriented ditch dug to form the corridor leading to those apartments. Two layers of massive limestone blocks were then set onto the prepared site, upon which the pyramid superstructure was to be built concurrently with the substructure.

The pyramid faces were framed by massive grey limestone blocks up to 5 m (16 ft) by 5.5 m (18 ft) by 1 m (3.3 ft) in size. The inner chambers and passageway were similarly framed, but using much smaller blocks. The frames were made by horizontally layering four or five courses of limestone, each 1 m (3.3 ft) thick, and bound using clay mortar, with particular attention paid to the mortaring of the corner stones. The pyramid core, between the two frames, was then packed with rubble fill composed of limestone chips, sand, pottery shards, and clay. Only the lowest step of Neferefre's pyramid was completed, before a hasty conversion into a square mastaba or primeval mound – as suggested by its name, iat (hill), found in the Abusir Papyri – was made to accommodate his funeral. The single step, about 7 m (23 ft; 13 cu) tall, was enclosed by roughly dressed fine white Tura limestone blocks sloped at ~78°. Above the chamber's ceiling, a flat roof terrace was built then covered in a thin layer of clay and gravel, completing the monument. Burial preparations, including mummification rituals, took a prescribed minimum of seventy days. Completion of the pyramid, a project that took years to finish, was therefore impossible.

The Abusir pyramids were thus constructed in a radically different manner to those of the preceding dynasties. This method of construction, albeit less time and resource consuming, was careless and unstable, and meant that only the outer casing was constructed using high quality limestone. Stripped of their valuable casing, their cores were exposed to further human destruction and natural erosion, leaving the Abusir pyramids as ruinous, formless mounds.

=== Substructure ===
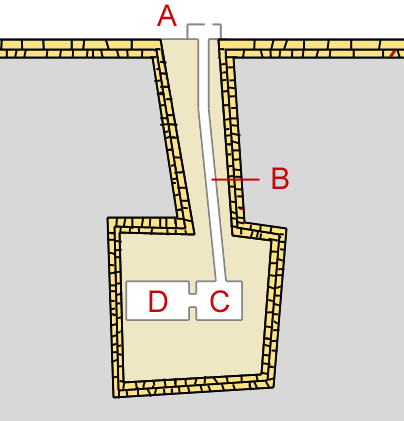
Substructure of the pyramid A: Entry B: Access passage C: Antechamber D: Burial chamber

The pyramid substructure was accessed from slightly above ground level on the middle of the pyramid's north side. A descending corridor, deflected slightly to the south-east, led to the funerary apartments. The corridor was reinforced with red granite near its terminus, and guarded by a red granite portcullis. In the middle of the corridor was a further security measure in the form of a massive red granite interlocking "jaw[-like]" barrier. A barrier of this type has not been verified in any other building, but appears to have been included due to the lack of protection for the tomb from above. The corridor terminates at an antechamber, with a burial chamber lying further to the west. The rooms are oriented along the east–west axis and each apartment was originally covered by a gabled fine white limestone ceiling. These have been severely damaged by stone thieves quarrying inside the pyramid who had easy access to the chambers from the roof terrace where they dug a ditch and set up a workshop. The pyramid was likely plundered in the First Intermediate Period, and then periodically mined for stone from the New Kingdom through to the nineteenth century.

In spite of the devastation wrought by stone thieves, remnants of the burial have been preserved. Inside the substructure fragments of a red granite sarcophagus, pieces of four alabaster canopic jars, alabaster sacrificial offering containers, and a partial mummy were recovered. The sarcophagus was covered by a convex lid with rectangular end pieces, had body walls 35 cm (1 ft 2 in) thick, and a length of no more than 2.7 m (8.9 ft). The red granite build is noteworthy, as Fifth Dynasty sarcophagi were typically made of greywacke. This suggests that Neferefre's sarcophagus was most likely an emergency solution. The mummy remains have been identified as belonging to a twenty to twenty-three-year-old male, probably Neferefre. Blocks from above the gabled ceiling also regularly contain an inscription reading Hut Neferefre approximately "Burial area of Neferefre". At the end of the corridor, a block with a date rnpt sp tpy, ꜣbd 4 ꜣḫt was uncovered, corresponding to the first or second year of Neferefre's reign, or assuming a biennial census then theoretically a third year, and briefly preceding the interruption of the pyramid construction process.

=== Mortuary temple ===
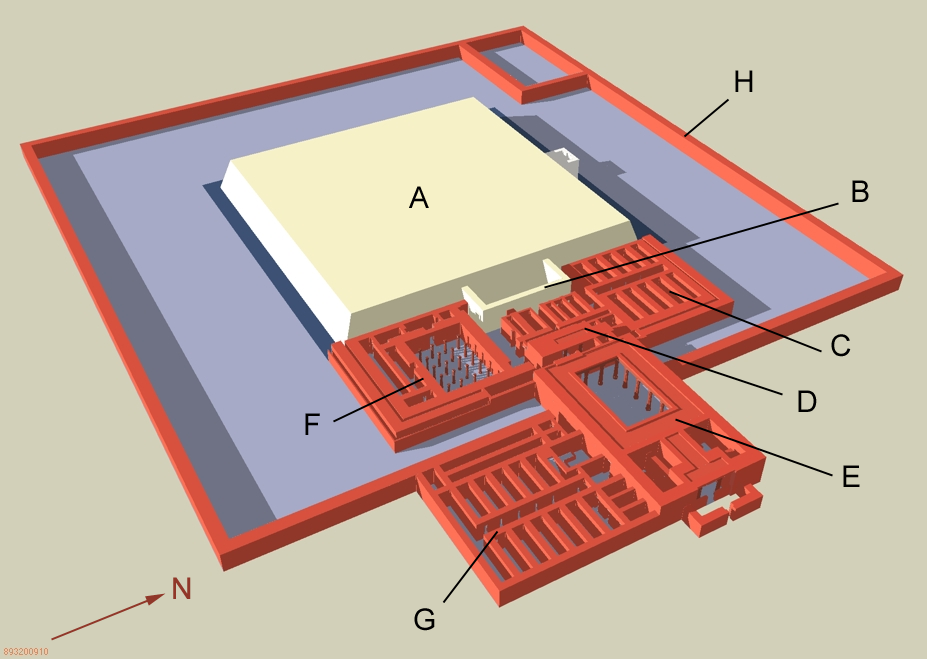
Reconstructions of the complex after the conversion from the pyramid to a mastaba and the completion of the ritual structures A: Pyramid stump B: Inner temple C: Storage magazines D: Mortuary temple E: Columned courtyard F: Hypostyle hall G: Sanctuary of the Knife H: Perimeter wall

At the end of the 1970s, with written evidence supporting its existence and a working hypothesis that the tomb was functional, a search was conducted for the mortuary temple of Neferefre's unfinished pyramid by the Czech team. A magnetometric survey of the sand plain on the pyramid's east side revealed a large, articulate, T-shaped mudbrick building buried under the sand. The building was confirmed to be the mortuary temple in the subsequent excavations.

==== First phase ====
According to Verner, the time required for burial arrangements was insufficient for anything more than a small improvised cult structure to be completed. This was built on a 5 m (16 ft) wide strip of limestone platform, retained originally for the pyramid's fine white limestone casing. The temple had a simple layout, with an unusual orientation along the north–south axis, (Note: The mortuary temple functioned as a symbolic resting place for the pharaoh. Here, priests tending to cult performed daily rituals and processions for the god king. It was believed that when an individual died, their ka, ba and body separated. The ka, approximately meaning life force, was sustained with food, hence the food offerings in the offering hall, the most significant room in the temple. The ba, which can be approximated to a soul, is the individual which travels into the afterlife in search of the ka. The body becomes inanimate, but, must not decay or else the ba will be unable to function. In the afterlife, when the parts reunited, the individual became an akh, the approximate equivalent to a ghost, representing the resurrected form of the king. The pyramid was an instrument which enabled this union to happen. As an akh the king is free to roam the earth and the sky, and is second only to the gods. The purpose of the burial rites and offerings was to allow the akh to form. The king would pass through the false door, have his meal, and then return to his tomb. The food was not physically eaten, rather, it was a token of a meal shared between the living in this world, and the deceased in the next. The corridor leading to the chambers in the pyramid served twin functions: first, to allow passage into the pyramid for the burial and second to allow the resurrected king to leave. From the king's perspective, the corridor ascended into the region of the sky in the north referred to as "the Imperishable Ones" where the king united with the goddess of the sky Nut, who ate the sun at sunset and gave birth to it at sunrise. In effect, she did the same to the king transforming him into a sun god. For this reason, the complex took on an east-west orientation, mirroring the sun's path through the sky.) and constructed from fine white limestone. Its sole entrance was a low stepped staircase on its south side, that led directly into a vestibule. Here, priests conducted purification rituals prior to entry, as evidenced by a small floor-set basin. The remaining temple comprised three chambers. The largest and most significant was the offering hall, which had a red granite false door and an offering altar. No trace of the false door and only an impression from the altar remains. Beneath the hall's pavement, the heads of a bull and a bird, miniature clay vessels with gray clay lids, and other offerings were found. Flanking either side of the hall were two long narrow rooms, which Verner posits may have hosted the funerary boats. It is unclear who finished the temple after Neferefre's death, but two clay seals bearing the Horus name of Shepseskare, Sekhemkau, were discovered in the vicinity suggesting that it may have been commissioned by him.

==== Second phase ====
In the second phase of construction, during the reign of Neferefre's younger brother, Nyuserre, the temple was significantly extended along its entire length. Constructed predominantly from mudbrick, – a cheaper and less durable alternative to limestone – it had a unique design. The architect was clearly influenced by the predicament of building a royal temple in front of a non-standard, non-pyramid royal tomb to break with custom and improvise. He retained the north–south orientation, but moved the entrance to the centre of the eastern façade, underneath a portico adorned with two white limestone lotus stalk columns. These supported an architrave, upon which a wood floored roof terrace was built.

Typically, the temple would include an entrance hall, open courtyard, and a five niche statue chapel, but these were forgone. Instead, beyond the entrance a transverse corridor led to five storage magazines, which held equipment for the mortuary cult, and – after a minor fire damaged the northern / western temple – one was repurposed to accommodate the ritual burial of two damaged wooden cult boats, apparently adorned with two thousand carnelian beads. The northern sector of the temple contained ten two-story storage magazines, arranged in two rows of five rooms opposite each other, all accessed from a single passage. Their arrangement reflected the five phyles of the priesthood that maintained the mortuary cult.

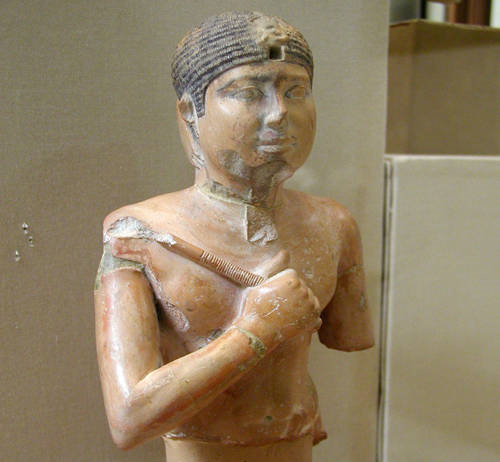
Limestone statuette of Neferefre, a ka statue from the hypostyle hall of the mortuary temple

Inside the storage magazines, significant collections of papyri, constituting the third Abusir temple archives, were unearthed. These provide a wealth of information regarding the daily operation of the mortuary cult and life in the Abusir pyramid complexes. Besides the papyri, frit tablets – depicting gods and the king, alongside gold leaf covered hieroglyphic inscriptions –, faience ornaments, stone vessels – variously of diorite, alabaster, gabro, limestone and basalt – flint knives and other remains were also discovered. Particularly significant to Egyptologists is the recovery of a vast quantity of clay sealings bearing the names of kings, officials, temples, palaces, gods and other details, which provide a plethora of information on administrative and economic organisation in the Old Kingdom.

The most significant architectural discovery was made in the southern temple, where, under nearly 4 m (13 ft) of sand, a long east–west oriented hypostyle hall with twenty-six wooden lotus columns, arranged in four rows of five columns, was uncovered. Verner states that this was the first discovery of a hypostyle hall from ancient Egypt, which he described as "absolutely unexpected". Its floor was paved with clay, which held the limestone bases of the wooden columns – none of which has been preserved beyond fragments of stucco and polychromatic paint – that supported the approximately 4 m (13 ft) high wooden ceiling. The ceiling has not survived, but remnants indicate that it was blue with painted gold stars. Inside the hall, numerous fragments of statues – diorite, basalt, limestone, red quartzite and wood – of Neferefre, and six complete portraits were recovered. The stone statues were between 35 cm (1 ft 2 in) and 80 cm (2 ft 7 in) tall. One such statue represented Neferefre seated upon his throne with a hedj mace grasped against his chest, a uraeus (originally) on his head, and with the outstretched wings of Horus protecting him from behind. Previously, this motif had been known to exist only from a single diorite statue of Khafre recovered from his valley temple in Giza. Fragments of life-size wooden statues of Neferefre and smaller wooden statues of bound and kneeling enemies of Egypt (Asiatics, Libyans and Nubians) were also found.

==== Third phase ====
During Nyuserre's reign, a further reconstruction of the temple was undertaken. It was further enlarged eastward, and an open columned courtyard, an entrance hall and a new columned entrance were added. A pair of limestone papyri-form columns adorned the new entrance, while twenty-two or twenty-four round wooden columns, possibly imitating date-palm trees, adorned the columned courtyard. No trace of a stone/alabaster altar, typically found in the north-west corner of the courtyard, has been preserved. The temple acquired the usual T-shaped ground plan in the restructure. During the reign of Djedkare Isesi, the columned courtyard became host to simple brick lodgings for the priests of the cult, who were active until Pepi II's reign at the end of the Sixth Dynasty, when the temple was abandoned, and also for a brief period in the Twelfth Dynasty, when the cult was revived.

=== Sanctuary of the Knife ===
South-east of the mortuary temple, a rectangular north–south oriented mudbrick building, built in two phases, was uncovered. The building served as a ritual abattoir in service to the mortuary cult. Temple archive papyri and vessel inscriptions identify it as "the Sanctuary of the Knife", and preserve an event in which 130 bulls were slaughtered at the abattoir during a ten-day festival.

The abattoir had a single, wide entrance in its north side through which cattle, goats, gazelles, and other animals were herded inside. In the north-west of the building was an open slaughterhouse, and in the north-east a butchery where the meat was prepared. There was also a staircase up to the roof terrace, which was perhaps used for drying meats. The remaining abattoir was occupied by storage rooms, which became the only operating area of the building after the third stage of the temple's construction. The abattoir was fully decommissioned and bricked up during the reign of Teti, at the start of the Sixth Dynasty. A Middle Kingdom burial was unearthed in the abattoir, belonging to a hunchbacked – caused by severe tuberculosis of the bone – man called Khuiankh, who had served as one of the last priests of the mortuary cult.

=== Perimeter wall ===
The unfinished pyramid and mortuary temple were surrounded by a massive brick perimeter wall, reinforced with limestone monoliths at its corners.

== Conjectural wife's tomb ==
The tomb of Khentkaus III, likely a wife of Neferefre, was discovered near his unfinished pyramid in Abusir. She was buried in a mastaba 16.12 m (52.9 ft; 30.76 cu) long by 10.70 m (35.1 ft; 20.42 cu) wide and with masonry preserved up to a height of 3.30 m (10.8 ft; 6.30 cu). The mastaba superstructure was primarily composed of locally quarried yellow and grey limestone, with a core of mudbrick, limestone debris, and pottery. This was encased in poor quality, unpolished white limestone indicating that construction was abandoned before completion.

Built into the superstructure was an offering chapel containing a vertical shaft leading into the tomb's substructure and burial chamber. Fragments of a mummy were recovered from the shaft, which anthropological analysis revealed belonged to a twenty-year-old female. Her name and titles were found recorded on Baugraffiti, and included the title of "mother of the king". Although the identity of her child was not found recorded among the epigraphy of the tomb, it is likely that the king being referred to is either Menkauhor or Shepseskare.

== Later history ==
In the New Kingdom, the mortuary temple was subject to dismantlement from stone quarrying for new projects. The white limestone built first phase of the temple was particularly affected by these attacks. In the hypostyle hall, a mudbrick ramp had been built by stone thieves who left behind vessels and chromatic glass, all dating to the New Kingdom period. Around the same time, a necropolis formed around the Abusir monuments containing the crude wooden coffins of common people, who had seemingly concluded that the shadow of the pyramids was the best final resting place. The cemetery remained active into the Roman period. The Abusir monuments were further dismantled at this time, as their limestone was sought after in lime production. Traces of this activity have been found in Neferefre's temple, particularly in the corridor and funerary apartments. Two limestone blocks from the north-east corner of the pyramid have incised Arabic inscriptions on them, most likely authored by commoner passers-by. The inscriptions were written in Kufic, and one line in Kufesque, dating to the 9th and 10th centuries AD. To the benefit of Neferefre's monument, its condition discouraged tomb robbers from looting the pyramid, allowing it to remain one of the best preserved complexes of the Old Kingdom.

== See also ==
- Egyptian pyramid construction techniques
- List of Egyptian pyramids
- List of megalithic sites

== Sources ==
- Allen, James; Allen, Susan; Anderson, Julie; et al. (1999). Egyptian Art in the Age of the Pyramids. New York: The Metropolitan Museum of Art. ISBN 978-0-8109-6543-0. OCLC 41431623.
- Altenmüller, Hartwig (2001). "Old Kingdom: Fifth Dynasty". In Redford, Donald B. (ed.). The Oxford Encyclopedia of Ancient Egypt, Volume 2. Oxford: Oxford University Press. pp. 597–601. ISBN 978-0-19-510234-5.
- Arnold, Dieter (2003). The Encyclopaedia of Ancient Egyptian Architecture. London: I.B. Tauris. ISBN 978-1-86064-465-8.
- Bareš, Ladislav (2000). "The destruction of the monuments at the necropolis of Abusir". In Bárta, Miroslav; Krejčí, Jaromír (eds.). Abusir and Saqqara in the Year 2000. Prague: Academy of Sciences of the Czech Republic – Oriental Institute. pp. 1–16. ISBN 80-85425-39-4.
- Bárta, Miroslav (2005). "Location of the Old Kingdom Pyramids in Egypt". Cambridge Archaeological Journal. 15 (2). Cambridge: 177–191. doi:10.1017/s0959774305000090. S2CID 161629772.
- Bárta, Miroslav (2017). "Radjedef to the Eighth Dynasty". UCLA Encyclopedia of Egyptology.
- Budge, Ernest Alfred Wallis (1920). An Egyptian Hieroglyphic Dictionary: With an index of English words, King List and Geographical List with Indexes, List of Hieroglyphic Characters, Coptic and Semitic Alphabets, etc. Vol. 1. London: J. Murray. OCLC 697736910.
- Clayton, Peter A. (1994). Chronicle of the Pharaohs. London: Thames & Hudson. ISBN 978-0-500-05074-3.
- Dodson, Aidan; Hilton, Dyan (2004). The Complete Royal Families of Ancient Egypt. London: Thames & Hudson. ISBN 0-500-05128-3.
- Edwards, Iorwerth (1999). "Abusir". In Bard, Kathryn (ed.). Encyclopedia of the archaeology of ancient Egypt. London; New York: Routledge. pp. 97–99. ISBN 978-0-203-98283-9.
- Krejčí, Jaromír (2000). "The royal necropolis at Abusir during the Old Kingdom". In Bárta, Miroslav; Krejčí, Jaromír (eds.). Abusir and Saqqara in the Year 2000. Prague: Academy of Sciences of the Czech Republic – Oriental Institute. pp. 467–484. ISBN 80-85425-39-4.
- Krejčí, Jaromír; Kytnarová, Katarína Arias; Odler, Martin (2014). "Archaeological excavation of the mastaba of Queen Khentkaus III (tomb AC 30) in Abusir". Prague Egyptological Studies. XV: 28–42. ISSN 1214-3189.
- Lehner, Mark (1999). "pyramids (Old Kingdom), construction of". In Bard, Kathryn (ed.). Encyclopedia of the archaeology of ancient Egypt. London; New York: Routledge. pp. 778–786. ISBN 978-0-203-98283-9.
- Lehner, Mark (2008). The Complete Pyramids. New York: Thames & Hudson. ISBN 978-0-500-28547-3.
- Lepsius, Karl Richard (1913) [1849]. Denkmäler aus Aegypten und Aethiopen. Bad Honnef am Rhein: Proff & Co. KG. OCLC 84318033.
- Málek, Jaromír (2003). "The Old Kingdom (c. 2686–2160 BC)". In Shaw, Ian (ed.). The Oxford History of Ancient Egypt. Oxford: Oxford University Press. pp. 83–107. ISBN 978-0-19-815034-3.
- Peck, William H. (2001). "Lepsius, Karl Richard". In Redford, Donald B. (ed.). The Oxford Encyclopedia of Ancient Egypt, Volume 2. Oxford: Oxford University Press. pp. 289–290. ISBN 978-0-19-510234-5.
- Sampsell, Bonnie (2000). "Pyramid Design and Construction – Part I: The Accretion Theory". The Ostracon. 11 (3). Denver.
- Shaw, Ian, ed. (2003). The Oxford History of Ancient Egypt. Oxford: Oxford University Press. ISBN 978-0-19-815034-3.
- Vachala, Břetislav; Ondráš, František (2000). "An Arabic inscription on the pyramid of Neferefre". In Bárta, Miroslav; Krejčí, Jaromír (eds.). Abusir and Saqqara in the Year 2000. Prague: Academy of Sciences of the Czech Republic – Oriental Institute. pp. 73–76. ISBN 80-85425-39-4.
- Verner, Miroslav (1994). Forgotten pharaohs, lost pyramids: Abusir (PDF). Prague: Academia Škodaexport. ISBN 978-80-200-0022-4. Archived from the original (PDF) on 2011-02-01.
- Verner, Miroslav (2000). "Newly discovered royal sarcophagi from Abusir". In Bárta, Miroslav; Krejčí, Jaromír (eds.). Abusir and Saqqara in the Year 2000. Prague: Academy of Sciences of the Czech Republic – Oriental Institute. pp. 561–580. ISBN 80-85425-39-4.
- Verner, Miroslav (2001a). "Archaeological Remarks on the 4th and 5th Dynasty Chronology" (PDF). Archiv Orientální. 69 (3). Prague: 363–418. ISSN 0044-8699.
- Verner, Miroslav (2001b). "Abusir". In Redford, Donald B. (ed.). The Oxford Encyclopedia of Ancient Egypt, Volume 1. Oxford: Oxford University Press. pp. 5–7. ISBN 978-0-19-510234-5.
- Verner, Miroslav (2001c). "Old Kingdom". In Redford, Donald B. (ed.). The Oxford Encyclopedia of Ancient Egypt, Volume 2. Oxford: Oxford University Press. pp. 585–591. ISBN 978-0-19-510234-5.
- Verner, Miroslav (2001d). The Pyramids: The Mystery, Culture and Science of Egypt's Great Monuments. New York: Grove Press. ISBN 978-0-8021-1703-8.
- Verner, Miroslav (2014). Sons of the Sun. Rise and decline of the Fifth Dynasty. Prague: Charles University. ISBN 978-8073085414.
