= Hana Vymazalová =

Czech egyptologist (born 1978)

Hana Vymazalova
- Born: 1978 (age 47–48)
- Education: Charles University

Hana Vymazalová (born 1978), is a Czech Egyptologist. She graduated in Egyptology and Logic at the Faculty of Arts, Charles University in Prague and has been a Professor of Egyptology at this University since 2025.

Her dissertation focused on accounting texts from the archives of king Neferefre. Her interests include the economy of Old Kingdom funerary complexes and the use of mathematics in administration. She has been a member of the Abusir excavation team since 2006.

Publications include but are not limited to:

- Hana Vymazalová, The accounting documents from the papyrus archive of Neferre and their specific terminology, Charles University in Prague, Czech Institute of Egyptology 2005. ARCHIVED COPY
- Hana Vymazalová - Miroslav Bárta (eds.), Chronology and Archaeology in Ancient Egypt (The Third Millennium B.C.), Prague 2008.
- Hana Vymazalová, The Wooden Tablets from Cairo: The Use of the Grain Unit hk3t in Ancient Egypt, Archiv Orientalni Vol 70, 2002, pp.27-42
- J. Krejčí, V.G. Callender, M. Verner, (with contributions by Viktor Černý, Eugen Strouhal, Hana Vymazalová and Martina Žaloudková-Kujanová), Abusir XII. Minor tombs in the Royal Necropolis I (The Mastabas of Nebtyemneferes and Nakhtsare, Pyramid Complex Lepsius no. 24 and Tomb Complex Lepsius no. 25), Prague 2008.
- Paule Posener–Kriéger – Miroslav Verner - Hana Vymazalová, Abusir X. The Pyramid Complex of Raneferef. The Papyrus Archive, Praha 2006.
- Vymazalová, Hana: Staroegyptská matematika. Hieratické matematické texty (Ancient Egyptian Mathematics. Hieratic Mathematical Texts); 1. vyd. 2006, Dějiny matematiky 31. Praha: Český egyptologický ústav; 150 s. ISBN 80-7308-156-3. Anotace: Egyptské matematické texty psané hieratickým písmem. Překlad a komentář. (Ancient Egyptian mathematical texts written in hieratic. Translation and commentary.)
