= Akhenaten and the Religion of Light =

Book

Akhenaten and the Religion of Light is a 1999 book-length examination of the ancient Egyptian pharaoh Akhenaten, his wife Nefertiti, and their joint household and reign over the Eighteenth Dynasty of Egypt. Akhenaten and Nefirti were the parents of Tutankhamun, the best-known of the Egyptian pharaohs since the discovery of his tomb in 1922.

It was written by Erik Hornung, a Latvian-born German Egyptologist. It was originally published under its German title, Echnaton: Die Religion des Lichtes. The co-regents and the wider eighteenth dynasty have been the subject of speculation by authors since the opening of the discipline, given Akhenaten's status as a potential precursor prophet to the Abrahamic faiths (cf. Sigmund Freud's end of career work Moses and Monotheism). Clear textual parallels between Psalm 104 and the Great Hymn to the Aten have been cited alongside general archeological evidence from the dynasty. Neumann credits Hormung with a succinct summary of the nascent religious system and potential linkages to Judaism and later history.
