= Khentkaus III =

xnt t kA kA kA s
Ḫnt kꜣw=s
- King's wife, King's mother

Queen consort of Egypt
- Tenure: c. 2450 BC
- Burial: Abusir, Giza, Egypt
- Spouse: Neferefre?
- Issue: Menkauhor Kaiu? Shepseskare?
- Dynasty: Fifth Dynasty
- Father: Neferirkare Kakai?
- Mother: Khentkaus II?
- Religion: Ancient Egyptian religion

Khentkaus III, often called Khentakawess III by news media, (fl. c. 2450 BC) was an ancient Egyptian queen consort who lived during the Fifth Dynasty. She was very likely a daughter of king Neferirkare Kakai and queen Khentkaus II, while her husband was equally likely king Neferefre, and her son the future king Menkauhor Kaiu.

== Discovery ==
On January 4, 2015, the discovery of Khentkaus III's tomb by Czech archaeologists was announced by Egyptian authorities. The Egyptian Antiquities Minister Mamdouh Eldamaty stated that there had been no knowledge of her existence prior to the discovery. She shares her name with two earlier Egyptian queens – Khentkaus I and II. The tomb – marked as AC 30 – was excavated in Abusir, which hosts several Fifth Dynasty pyramids. It was found near Neferefre's pyramid complex by a Czech archaeological team led by Miroslav Bárta of Charles University in Prague, with Egyptian collaboration. Eldamaty stated that "[t]his discovery will help us shed light on certain unknown aspects of the Fifth Dynasty, which along with the Fourth Dynasty, witnessed the construction of the first pyramids."

== Tomb ==
Prior to excavation, tomb AC 30 appeared to be an elongated, north–south oriented mound – later confirmed to be a mastaba – 23 m (75 ft) long by 18 m (59 ft) wide with a maximal elevation of 1.5 m (4.9 ft). Indications of severe damage from stone thieving were immediately identifiable from the debris, which is typical of other tombs in the Abusir necropolis. The floor of the tomb's courtyard was covered in a layer of mud and admixture of gravel. In contrast with AC 29, AC 30 does not appear to have a lower level of mud floor. Once excavated, the mastaba was determined to be 16.12 m (52.9 ft) long by 10.7 m (35 ft), with masonry preserved up to a height of 3.30 m (10.8 ft). It had an offering chapel, and a vertical shaft through which the substructure was accessed.

The superstructure's outer faces were built from locally quarried yellow and grey limestone joined using a mud and lime mortar. Its inner core was of mediocre quality, predominantly consisting of limestone debris, mudbrick and substantial quantities of pottery. This was encased with massive, but poor quality, rough white limestone blocks indicating that construction was abandoned after the owner's death. The superstructure is entered on the eastern façade through a 85 cm (2.79 ft) wide entryway giving access to a 3.87 m (12.7 ft) by 1.24 m (4.1 ft) L-shaped offering chapel. The entrance sidewalls were built from fine quality white limestone, and the chapel originally contained two false doors on its western wall, but stone thieves have severely damaged the chapel's masonry. The method of construction indicates the chapel was built in the latter half of the Fifth Dynasty. Overall, the tomb is smaller among the social elite and royal family tombs in Abusir.

The vertical shaft, for entering the substructure, was found behind the northern false door inside the chapel. Its maximum preserved depth is 5.45 m (17.9 ft), and its side walls are in a reasonable state of preservation – only the upper part of the south wall has been destroyed. Inside, a small bḏꜣ-mould, parts of a calf, shards of pottery, charcoal, wooden fragments, and rope segments were discovered. The southern wall of the shaft contains a narrow passage 93 cm (3.05 ft) long, 82 cm (2.69 ft) wide and 1.11 m (3.6 ft) high that gives access to the burial chamber. A sloping ramp fashioned from limestone fragments, evidently used to transport the mummy into the tomb, led into the burial chamber, which measured 3.73 m (12.2 ft) long, 2.32 m (7.6 ft) wide and 2.14 m (7.0 ft) tall. It once had a nearly flat ceiling, but this has been destroyed. A single, massive limestone block remains in situ in the chamber's westernmost area. Its size indicates that the tomb belonged to a royal family member. The chamber originally contained a white limestone sarcophagus in its western area, but it too has been destroyed. Remains of the burial discovered include 23 travertine model vessels, 2 white limestone lids presumably from canopic jars, 4 copper models of tools, animal bones, fragments of wooden items, bandages and cloth from the embalming process. The quality of craftsmanship on these items is high. Two types of pottery were discovered inside the tomb: those used in the core masonry of the structure to reduce construction time and expense, and those used in the practices of the mortuary cult. Skeletal fragments of the owner were recovered during excavation which identified the tomb owner as a 20 year old woman.

The tomb's owner and titles were identified through the baugraffiti found on the side walls of the chapel and shaft, the substructure pavement, and in the passage connecting the shaft and burial chamber and also includes construction dates. She was 'king's wife' (ḥmt-nswt) and 'king's mother' (mwt-nswt) Khentkaus (Ḫnt-kꜣw.s). An abbreviated variant of her name Khent (Ḫnt) was found in the space above her burial chamber, below the ceiling level. It is improbable that these blocks originated from the Pyramid of Khentkaus II, as the titles on the blocks are uniform, unlike those of Khentkaus II's. There are also no such blocks present in the other nearby tombs of AC 25 and AC 29. The tomb's proximity to Neferefre's unfinished pyramid suggests a spousal relationship. Significantly, that she was a 'king's mother' indicates that her progeny succeeded to the Egyptian throne. This king is not named in the epigraphy of her tomb, but is probably either Menkauhor or the ephemeral Shepseskare.

== Bibliography ==
- Verner, Miroslav (2014). Sons of the Sun. Rise and decline of the Fifth Dynasty. Prague: Charles University. ISBN 978-8073085414.
- Krejčí, Jaromír; Kytnarová, Katarína Arias; Odler, Martin (2014). "Archaeological excavation of the mastaba of Queen Khentkaus III (tomb AC 30) in Abusir". Prague Egyptological Studies. XV: 28–42. ISSN 1214-3189.
