= Statuette of Neferefre =

Ancient Egyptian artefact

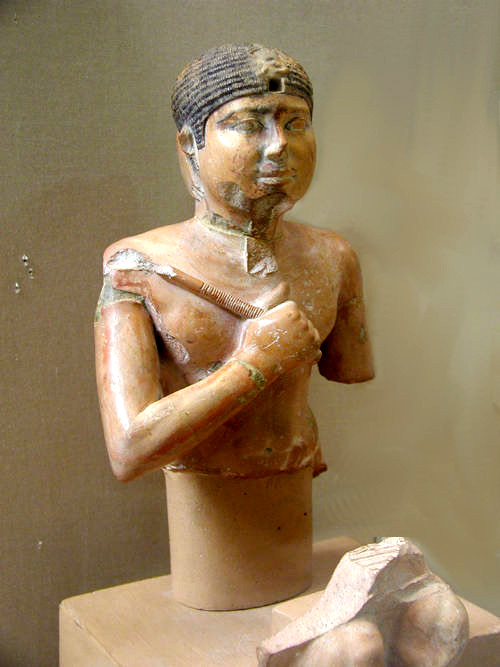
- Material: Limestone
- Height: 34 cm (original)
- Created: c. 2460 BC
- Discovered: 1984 or 1985; Abusir, Giza, Egypt
- Present location: Egyptian Museum, Cairo, Cairo Governorate, Egypt
- Registration: JE 98171
- Period: Old Kingdom

The Statuette of Neferefre is a Ka statue of king Neferefre that was found in several fragments by Czechoslovak excavations in 1984 or 1985 in the remains of his pyramid temple at Abusir. It was once about 34 cm high. The statuette is now on display in the Egyptian Museum of Cairo (JE 98171). Due to the good preservation of the face and the well-preserved colours, it is one of the most famous examples of Egyptian royal sculpture dating to the Old Kingdom.

== Details ==
The statue is made of pink limestone and was found in several fragments but the remains are not complete. It shows the king sitting on a throne. The latter is mostly missing. The king wears a short wig. On his forehead, there is now a hole for holding an Uraeus, that is lost today. The hair is painted black, above the lips is painted a black mustache. The nose is partially broken. The king had a ceremonial beard that is lost today. On his neck is sitting a falcon spreading its wings over the back of the king's head. In both crawls it is holding a Shen ring. The king is shown bare-chested. In his right hand he is holding a mace. The left arm is mostly missing. The lower part of the body is mostly missing too. The well carved knees are preserved showing that he was wearing a shendyt kilt. There is a fragment from the base with the remains of the right foot. On the base is carved the short inscription: the king of Upper and Lower Egypt, Neferefre, for eternity. There is finally a fragment from the back of the throne and one other, undecorated fragment of the base.

== Discovery ==
The fragments were found at three places within the pyramid temple of Neferefre. Four of them were found in columned hall in the southwest part of the temple. Three further fragments come from a long storage room, just south of this hall, two other fragments from a small room east of the hall.

== Bibliography ==
- Miroslav Verner: Abusir XXVIII, The Statues of Raneferef and the Royal Sculpture of the Fifth Dynasty, Charles University, Prague 2017, ISBN 978-80-7308-745-6
