= Erik Hornung =

German Egyptologist (1933–2022)

Erik Hornung (28 January 1933 – 11 July 2022) was a Latvian-born German egyptologist and one of the most influential modern writers on ancient Egyptian religion. He was professor emeritus of Basel University.

== Biography ==
Hornung was born in Riga, Latvia in 1933 and gained his PhD at the University of Tübingen in 1956. He was Professor of Egyptology at the University of Basel from 1967 to 1998. His main research field has been funerary literature, the Valley of the Kings in particular. He published the first edition of the Book of Amduat in three volumes between 1963 and 1967. J. Gwyn Griffiths described Hornung as the foremost authority in such literature. His book Conceptions of God in Ancient Egypt, The One and the Many has become his best-known work, in which he concludes, whilst acknowledging previous work by Henri Frankfort and his "multiplicity of approaches" and John A. Wilson's "complementary" treatment of Egyptian modes of thought, that "Anyone who takes history seriously will not accept a single method as definitive; the same should be true of anyone who takes belief seriously". Hornung became Vice-President of the Society of the Friends of the Royal Tombs of Egypt in 1988. His books have been published in German, but many have been translated into English.

== Select bibliography ==
- Conceptions of God in Ancient Egypt, The One and the Many, 1982 (Translated by John Baines, original German edition 1971)
- The Valley of the Kings: Horizon of Eternity, 1990
- The Tomb of Pharaoh Seti I, 1991
- History of Ancient Egypt. An Introduction, 1999
- Akhenaten and the Religion of Light, 1999
- The Ancient Egyptian Books of the Afterlife, 1999
- The Secret Lore of Egypt, 2001
