= Pyramid of Sahure =

Fifth Dynasty Egyptian pyramid complex

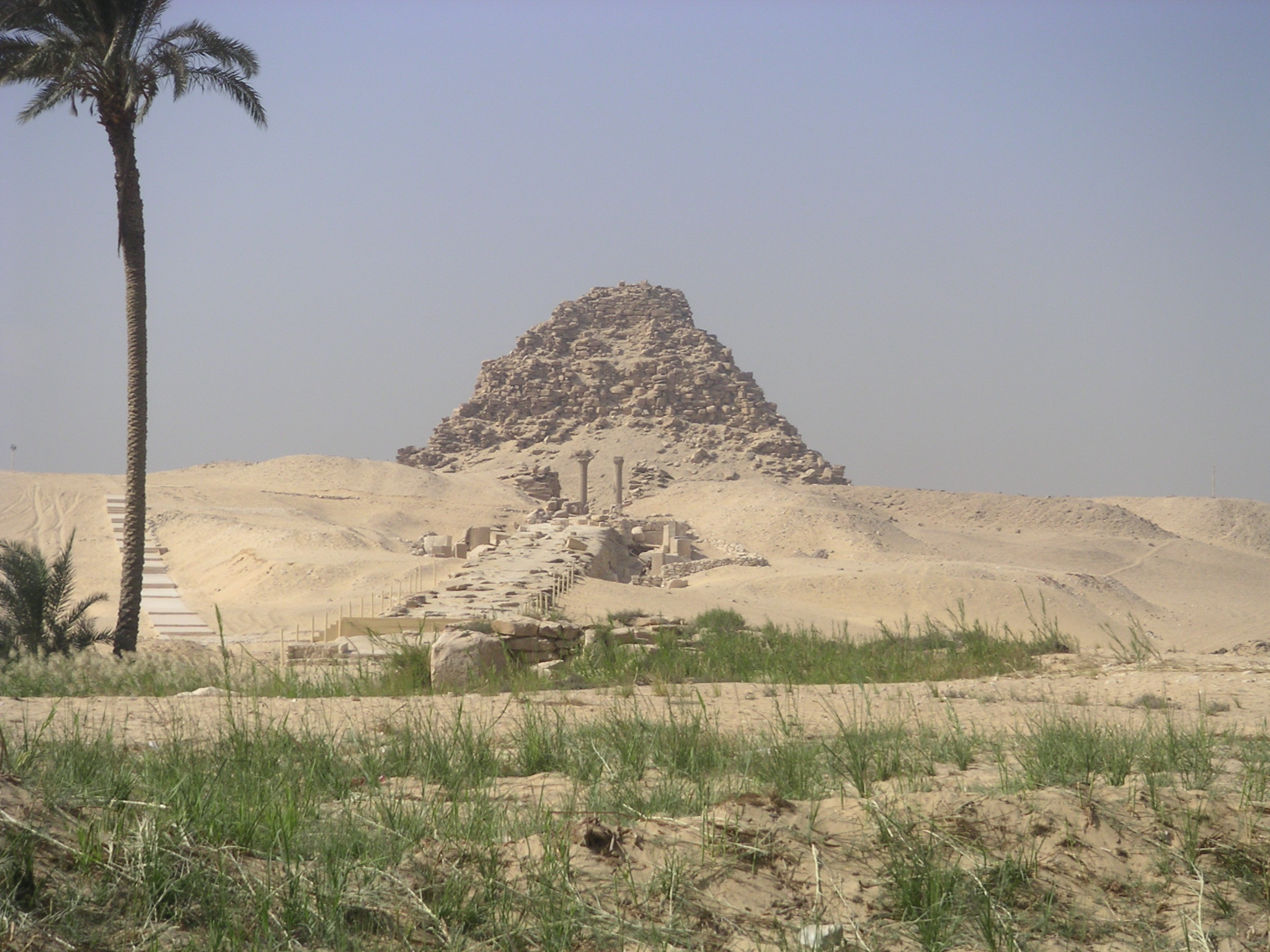

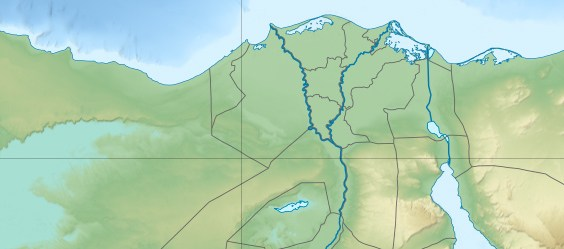
- Location within Lower Egypt
- 29°53′52″N 31°12′12″E
- Owner: Sahure
Ancient name
- < N5 D61 G43 > N28 G29 O24
- Ḫꜥỉ-bꜣ Sꜣḥw-Rꜥ
- Khai-ba Sahura
- 'The rising of the ba spirit' of Sahure
- Alternatively translated as 'The ba of Sahure appears' or 'Sahure's soul shines'
- Constructed: Fifth Dynasty
- Type: True (now ruined)
- Material: Limestone
- Height: ~ 47 m (154.2 ft) to 48 m (157.5 ft)
- Base: ~ 78.5 m (257.5 ft) to 78.75 m (258.4 ft)
- Volume: 96,542 m^{3} (126,272 cu yd)
- Slope: ~ 50°11′40″ or 50°30′

The pyramid of Sahure (Egyptian: Ḫꜥỉ-bꜣ Sꜣḥw-Rꜥ, lit. 'Rising of the ba of Sahure') is the funerary monument built for the Egyptian pharaoh Sahure of the Fifth Dynasty in the late 26th to 25th century BC. (Note: Proposed dates for Sahure's reign: c. 2506–2492 BC, c. 2491–2477 BC, c. 2487–2475 BC, c. 2458–2446 BC, c. 2385–2373 BC. Radiocarbon dating conducted on 'short-lived plant remains' from the Old Kingdom, paired with historical information and Bayesian modelling positioned Sahure's accession to between 2542 and 2460 BC with a 95% credible interval and between 2524 and 2482 BC with a 68% credible interval.) This initiated a period of pyramid building by Sahure's successors in Abusir, on a location earlier used by Userkaf for his sun temple. The site was first properly excavated by Ludwig Borchardt between March 1907 and 1908, who wrote the standard work Das Grabdenkmal des Königs Sahu-Re ('The Funerary Monument of King Sahure') between 1910 and 1913.

The pyramid complex's layout was adopted by succeeding kings of the Fifth and Sixth Dynasties, marking a milestone in pyramid complex construction. Compared to the preceding Fourth Dynasty, the immensity of the constructions was dramatically reduced but, in tandem, the decorative programme proliferated and temples were augmented by enlarged storeroom complexes. The complex is estimated to have had 10,000 m^{2} (110,000 ft^{2}) of finely carved relief adorning its walls, of which 150 m^{2} (1,600 ft^{2}) has been preserved. Some of these reliefs are considered unparalleled in Egyptian art, such as the 8 m (26 ft) by 3 m (9.8 ft) hunting scene from the mortuary temple. (Note: A description by Dorothea Arnold, former head of the Department of Egyptian Art at the Metropolitan Museum of Art: 'The remorseless precision with which these injuries are described was never equaled in Egyptian art. The king's striding figure seen on the blocks on the left towers over the victims, not only in height but also by virtue of its aura of physical strength and royal bearing.' A statement by Miroslav Verner, director of the Czech archaeological excavations at Abusir: 'At the same time the relief decoration [...] is so rich in subject matter, artistic conception and quality of workmanship that it represents the highest level of the genre that has yet been discovered from the Old Kingdom.' The foremost excavator of Sahure's pyramid, Ludwig Borchardt, concluded his remarks on the Jagd ('Hunt') with: Sowohl mit seiner Gesamtkomposition wie in der sicheren und gewandten Zeichnung der Einzeltypen steht also der Künstler des Jagdbildes aus dem S′aʒḥu-reˁ-Tempel jedenfalls an der Spitze. Translating to: 'Thus the artist of the hunting scene from the Sahure temple stands at the top [of his profession], due to the overall composition, as well as due to the secure and elegant drawing of single types'.) For comparison, Sahure's temple contained 370 running metres (1,214 running feet) of such relief decoration, while the temple of Khufu's Great Pyramid contained 100 running metres (328 running feet). The complex is also remarkable for the array of valuable materials – such as granite, alabaster and basalt – used extensively in its construction.

The main pyramid was built from roughly hewn limestone blocks bound with mud mortar and encased with fine white Tura limestone. It had a base of about 78.5 m (258 ft; 149.8 cu) to 78.75 m (258.4 ft; 150.29 cu) long converging at either 50°11′40″ or 50°30′ towards the apex between 47 m (154 ft; 90 cu) and 48 m (157 ft; 92 cu) high. The architects made an error in demarcating the pyramid base, extending it too far east. The pyramid's internal chambers were devastated by stone thieves, rendering an accurate reconstruction impossible. Stone fragments believed to belong to the king's basalt sarcophagus are the only remains of the burial that have been found. The mortuary temple adjacent to the pyramid's east face comprises an entrance hall, an open courtyard, a five-niche statue chapel, an offering hall, and storerooms. These elements had appeared in mortuary temples since the reign of Khafre. South of the temple is the enclosure with the cult pyramid, employing the same construction method used in the main pyramid but on a reduced scale, with a base length of 15.7 m (52 ft; 30.0 cu) converging at 56° to a peak 11.6 m (38 ft; 22.1 cu) high. The complex's two temples are linked by a 235 m (771 ft; 448 cu) long intricately decorated and well-illuminated causeway. The valley temple is situated on Abusir lake and is unusual for having two entrances: the main on its east side, and a secondary one on its south. It remains unclear why a second entry point was built, though it may have been connected to a pyramid town to its south.

Sahure's mortuary temple became the object of a cult of Sekhmet around the Eighteenth Dynasty. The cult was active through to the Ptolemaic Kingdom, though its influence began to wane following the reign of Ramesses II. This period heralded the first wave of destruction on the Abusir monuments, whilst Sahure's escaped the dismantlement, possibly as a result of the cult's presence. The monuments stirred interest again in the Twenty-Fifth to Twenty-Sixth Dynasties, which is shown by the copying of reliefs from the mortuary temples of Sahure, Nyuserre and Pepi II by the pharaoh Taharqa for the temple of Kawa in Nubia. A second wave of destruction of the Abusir monuments took place in the Twenty-Seventh Dynasty, but Sahure's temple was spared again, the cult still being present. With the onset of the Roman period, the Abusir monuments, including Sahure's, were subjected to a third wave of destruction. At the beginning of the Christian era, Sahure's temple became the site of a Coptic shrine, as evidenced by the recovery of pottery and graffiti dating to between the 4th and 7th century AD. Thereafter, until the late 19th century, the monuments were periodically quarried for limestone.

== Location and excavation ==
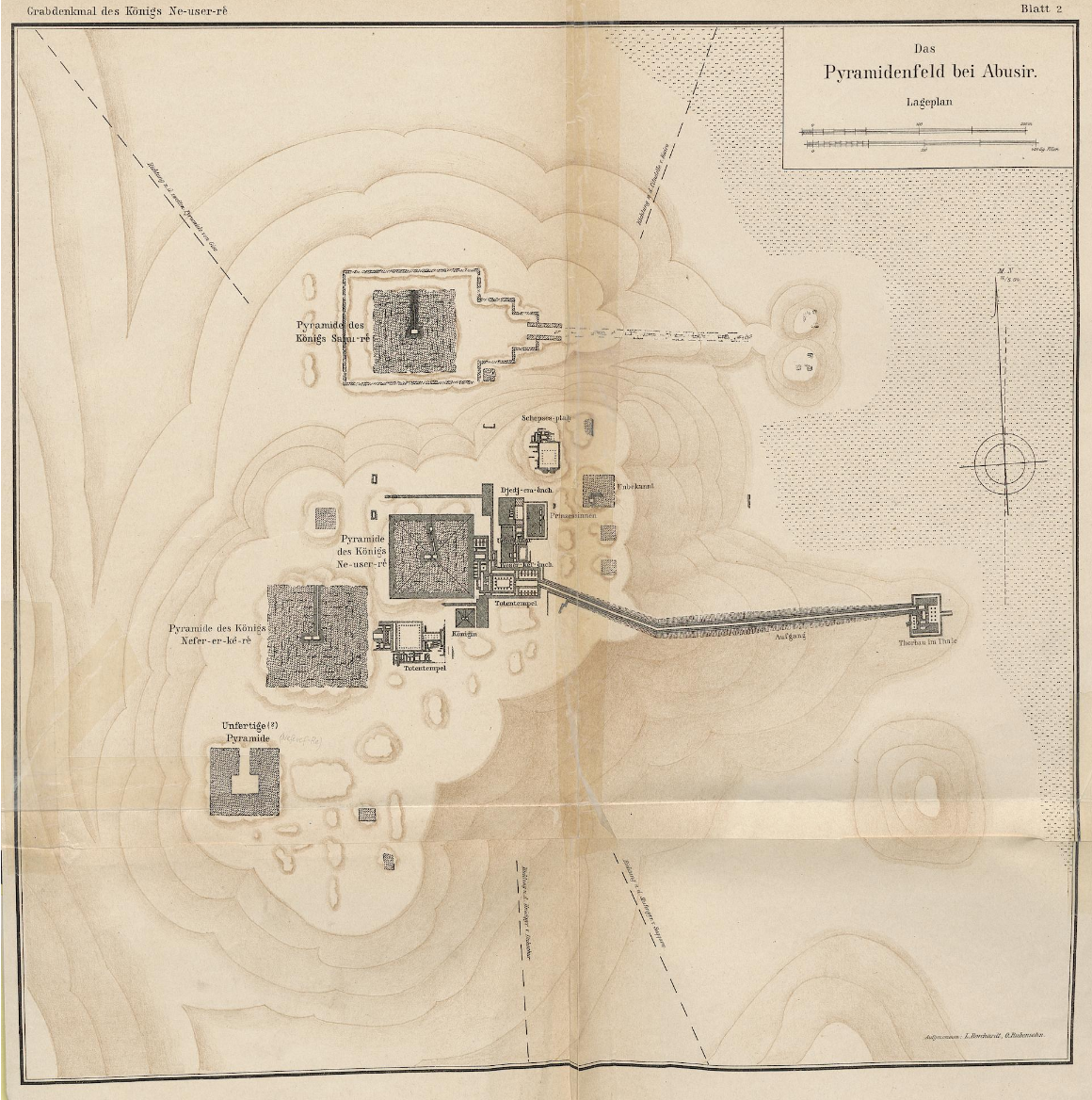
A lithograph of the Abusir necropolis showing the locations of Sahure's (northernmost), Nyuserre's, Neferirkare's, and Neferefre's (unfinished) pyramids

Sahure chose a site near Abusir for his funerary monument, thus constructing the first pyramid in the region. Earlier, Userkaf, founder of the Fifth Dynasty, chose Abusir for his sun temple. It is unclear why Userkaf sought such a remote site. It may have been significant for the nearby cult of Ra, or, in the opinion of the Egyptologist Werner Kaiser, the southernmost point from which the gilded pyramidion of the pillar-like structure in the temple of Ra in Heliopolis could be seen. It is clear, however, that his decision influenced the history of Abusir, including Sahure's decision to build his monument there. Three of the Abusir pyramids – Sahure, Neferirkare and Neferefre – are linked at the northwest corners by an imaginary line running to Heliopolis (Iunu). The diagonal was broken by Nyuserre, who positioned his complex between those of Neferirkare and Sahure.

Early excavators did not perform thorough investigations of Sahure's monument, perhaps discouraged by its ruined state. In 1838, John Shae Perring, an engineer working under Colonel Howard Vyse, cleared the entrances to the Sahure, Neferirkare and Nyuserre pyramids. Perring was the first to enter the substructure of Sahure's pyramid in modern times. Five years later, Karl Richard Lepsius, sponsored by King Frederick William IV of Prussia, explored the Abusir necropolis and catalogued Sahure's pyramid as XVIII. The pyramid was also re-entered by Jacques de Morgan, but he too did not explore further. No further investigations were performed for the next fifty years until the Egyptologist Ludwig Borchardt visited the site.

From 1902 to 1908, Borchardt, working for the Deutsche Orient-Gesellschaft (German Oriental Society), had the Abusir pyramids resurveyed and their adjoining temples and causeways excavated. From March 1907 to March 1908, Borchardt had Sahure's pyramid thoroughly investigated, and had trial digs conducted at nearby sites, including Neferefre's unfinished pyramid. He published his findings in the two-volume study Das Grabdenkmal des Königs Sahu-re (1910–13), which remains the standard work on the complex.

In 1994, the Egyptian Supreme Council of Antiquities opened the Abusir necropolis to tourism. In preparation, restorative works were conducted at Sahure's pyramid. The archeologist Zahi Hawass had a segment of Sahure's causeway cleaned and reconstructed, during which large relief-decorated limestone blocks that had been buried in the sand were uncovered. The reliefs found on these blocks were thematically and artistically unique and shed new light on the decorative programme of the complex.

== Mortuary complex ==
=== Layout ===
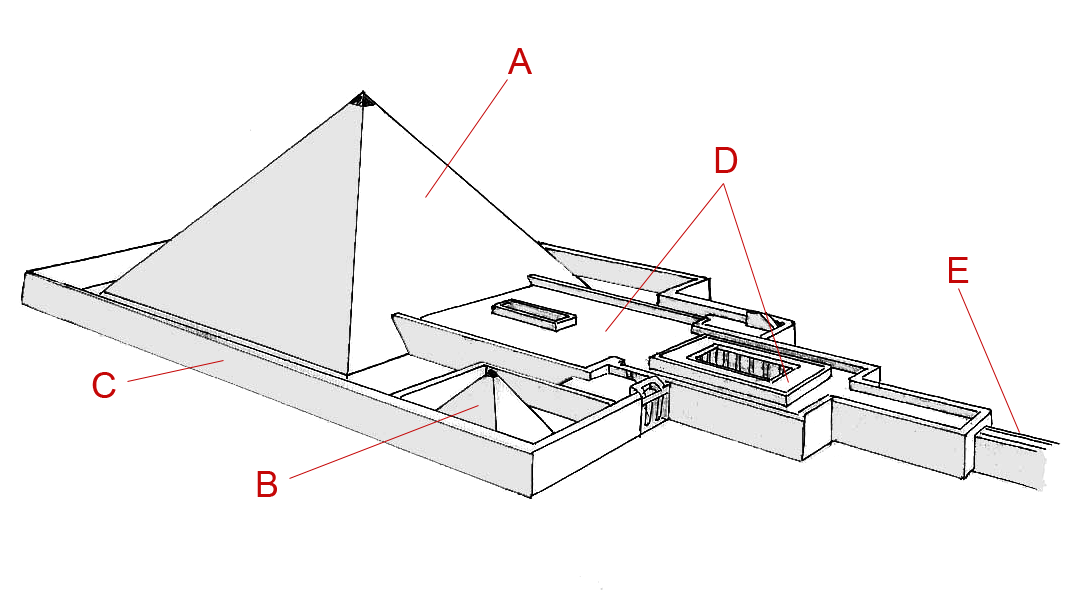
Layout of the mortuary complex, excluding the valley temple. In order: A) main pyramid; B) cult pyramid; C) enclosure wall; D) mortuary temple; and E) causeway

Old Kingdom mortuary complexes typically consist of five main components: (1) a valley temple; (2) a causeway; (3) a mortuary temple; (4) a cult pyramid; and (5) the main pyramid. Sahure's east–west oriented complex contains all of these elements. Its 47 m (154 ft; 90 cu) tall main pyramid comprised six ascending steps of stone encased in fine white limestone, with a cult pyramid located at the south-east corner, and a mortuary temple, the standard-bearer for future variants, adjacent to its east face. These connected to the valley temple, situated on Abusir lake, by a 235 m (771 ft; 448 cu) long limestone causeway. From the outset of the Fifth Dynasty, the main pyramids were dramatically reduced in size and adopted simplified construction techniques. Meanwhile, relief decoration advanced in wealth of subject matter and quality of workmanship, and temples were outfitted with expansive storeroom complexes. Except for minor deviations, the complex built by Sahure became the model for the remainder of the Fifth and Sixth Dynasties and the arrangement of the apartments of his mortuary temple became the standard for subsequent temples of the type in the Old Kingdom. Thereby it marked a milestone in the development of pyramid complex construction.

The complex is well-decorated, containing thematically diverse relief-work identified by the Egyptologist Miroslav Verner as 'the highest level of the genre' found in the Old Kingdom. Across its entirety, it is estimated that 10,000 m^{2} (110,000 ft^{2}) of finely carved relief adorned the walls. His mortuary temple alone contained 370 running metres (1,214 running feet) of relief decorations. By contrast, Sneferu's mortuary temple contained 64 running metres (210 running feet) of relief decoration, Khufu's contained 100 running metres (328 running feet), and the temple of Sahure's direct predecessor Userkaf contained 120 running metres (394 running feet). The mortuary temple of Pepi II, the last king of the Old Kingdom, contained 200 running metres (656 running feet) of relief decoration, indicating a decline after Sahure too. No more than 150 m^{2} (1,600 ft^{2}) of fragmentary relief has been preserved from Sahure's temple, but this is considered well-preserved. Additionally, Sahure reserved 916 m^{2} (9,860 ft^{2}) of the mortuary temple's 4,246 m^{2} (45,700 ft^{2}) floorplan for storerooms, accounting for 21.6% of its total area. By comparison, the 800 m^{2} (8,600 ft^{2}) temple of Sneferu's Red Pyramid at Dahshur, and 2,000 m^{2} (22,000 ft^{2}) temple of Khufu's Great Pyramid had no storerooms, while the 1,265 m^{2} (13,620 ft^{2}) temple of Khafre's pyramid reserved less than 200 m^{2} (2,200 ft^{2}) of space for storerooms, accounting for 15.8% of its total area. This change represents a shift in priority towards the daily activities of the mortuary cult.

=== Main pyramid ===
Sahure's pyramid is situated upon a hill elevated 20 m (66 ft) above the Nile valley. Although the subsoil of the area has never been investigated, evidence from the nearby mastaba of Ptahshepses suggests that the pyramid was not embedded into bedrock, but on a platform constructed from at least two layers of limestone. The pyramid had a core comprising six ascending steps, five of which remain. The steps were probably built from horizontally laid courses of limestone. (Note: Borchardt, who conducted the excavations at Sahure's pyramid, described the pyramid core as composed of accretion layers. This was challenged by Vito Maragioglio and Celeste Rinaldi who conducted careful examinations of pyramidal architecture in the Old Kingdom and failed to find blocks lying on a slant in any Fourth or Fifth Dynasty pyramid they studied. Rather, they found that in each instance these blocks were always set horizontally, leading them to reject the accretion layer hypothesis. The theory was effectively disproven by the Czech excavation team at Abusir led by Miroslav Verner, whereupon investigating Neferefre's unfinished pyramid, they discovered four or five horizontally layered courses of limestone blocks and an inner line of blocks framing the inner chambers.) The core consisted of low-grade roughly cut limestone bound with mud mortar, and was encased by fine white limestone.

The pyramid was constructed in a drastically different manner to those of the preceding dynasty. Its outer faces were framed using massive, roughly dressed grey limestone blocks well joined with mortar. The inner chambers were similarly framed, but using considerably smaller blocks. The core of the pyramid, between the two frames, was then packed with a rubble fill of limestone chips, pottery shards, and sand, with clay mortaring. This method, while less time- and resource-consuming, was careless and unstable, and meant that only the outer casing was constructed using high-quality limestone.

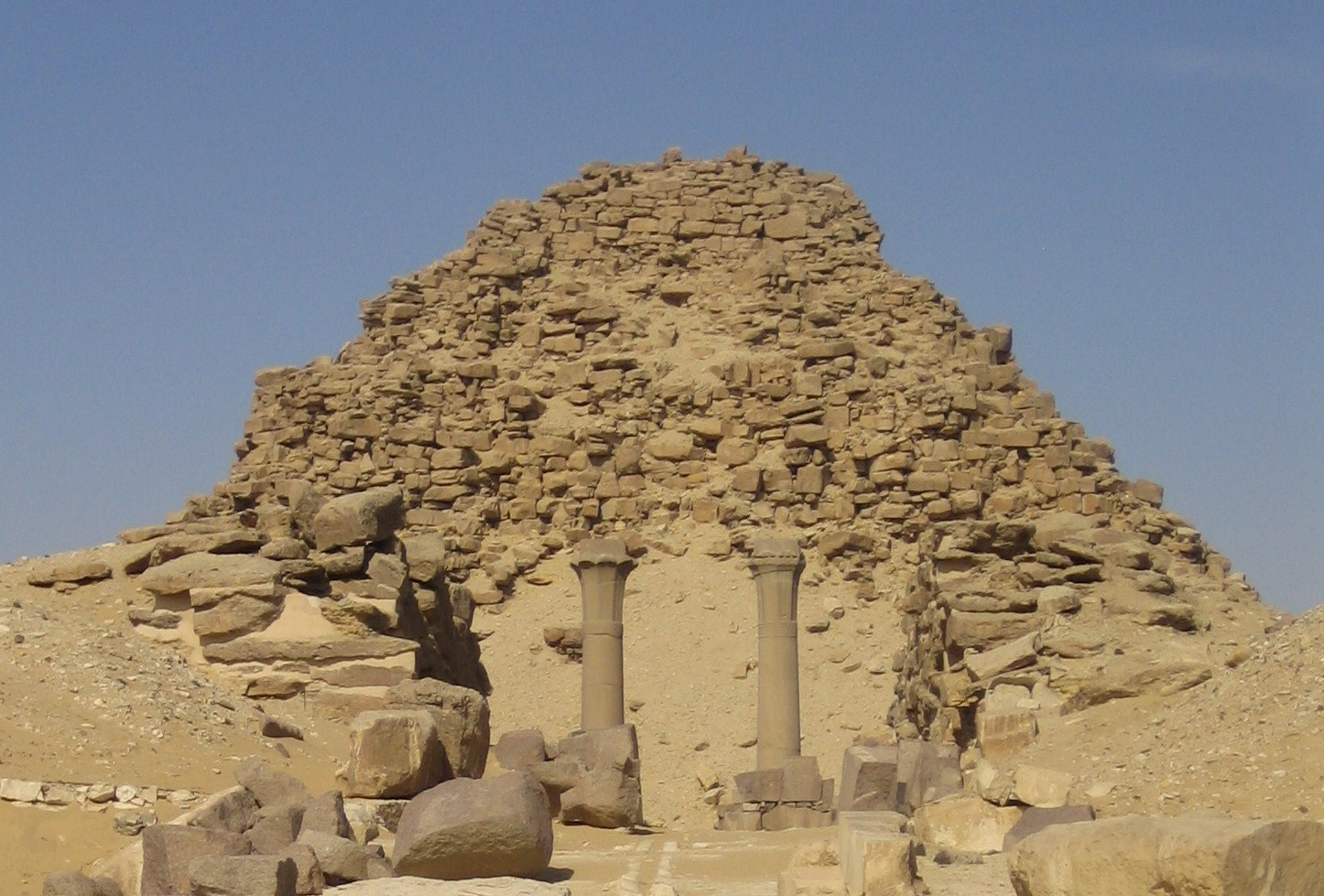
The pyramid from the end of the causeway

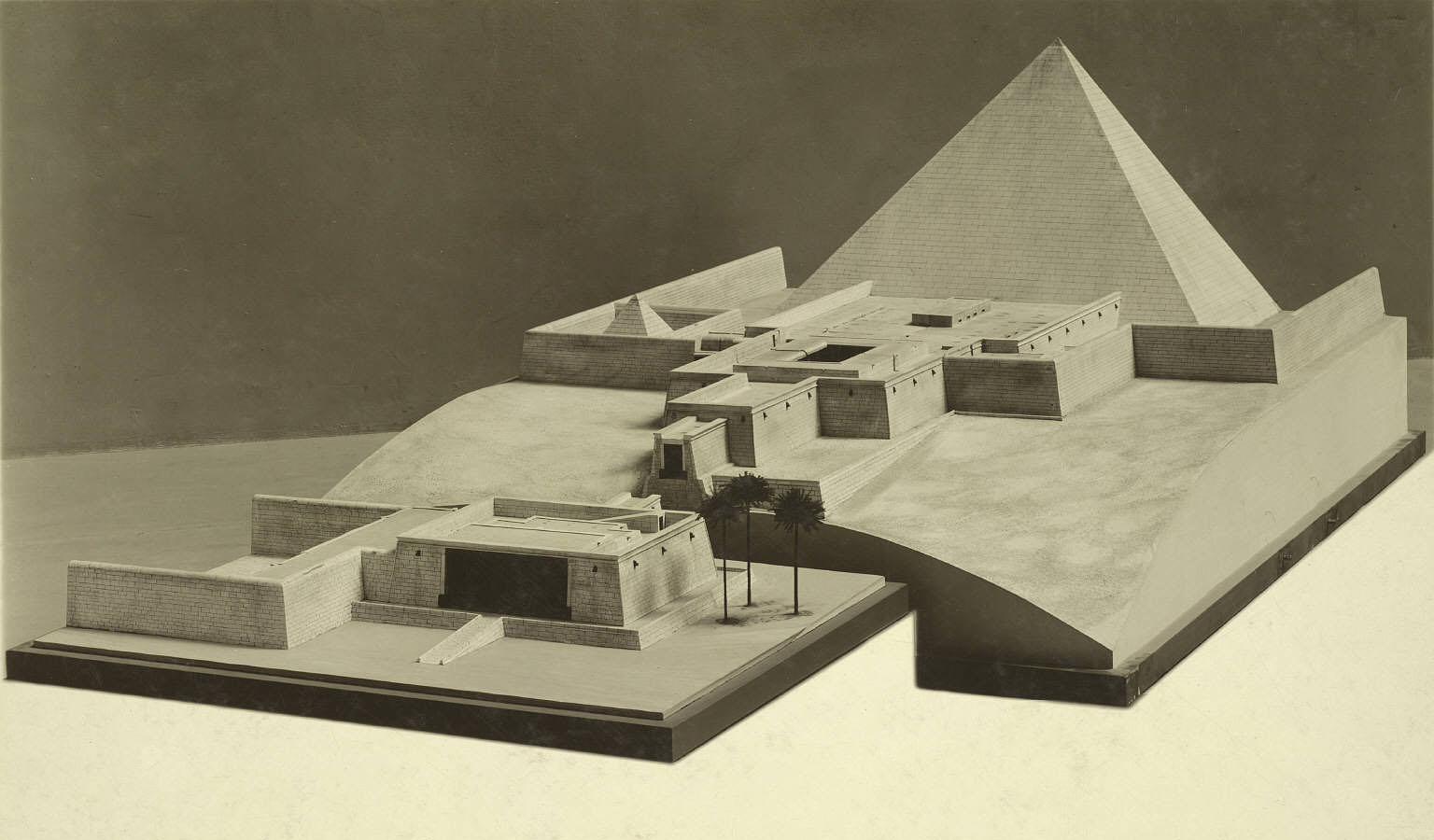
Model of the complex from the Metropolitan Museum of Art (Note: The foreground structure is the valley temple, while the background contains the mortuary temple, main and cult pyramids.)

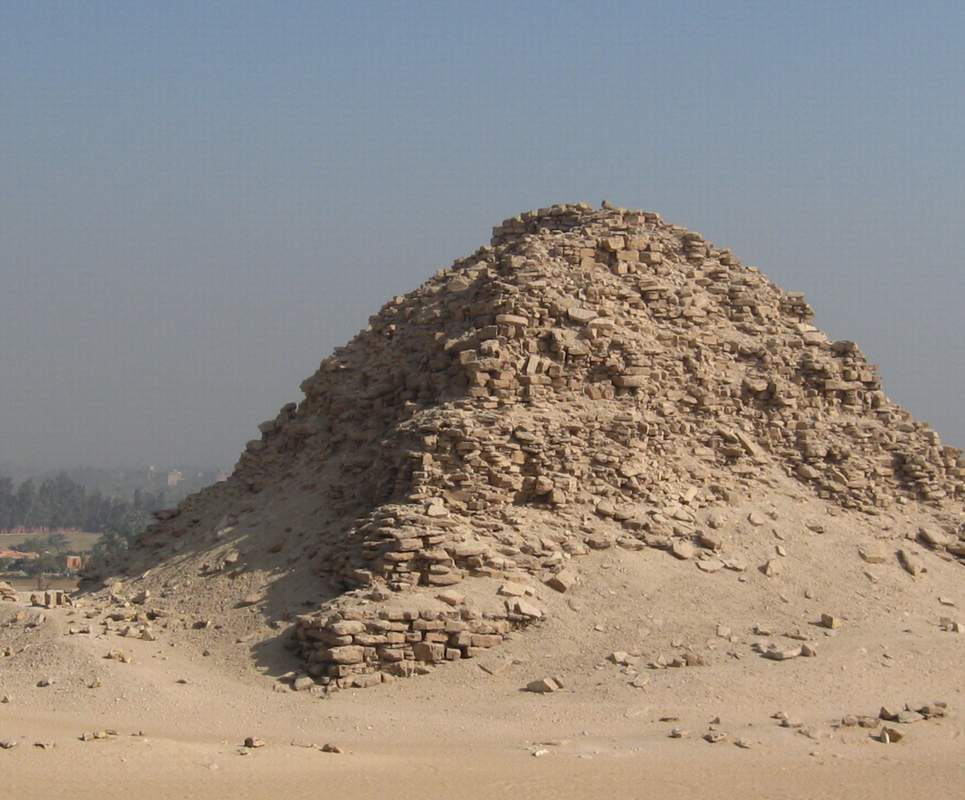
Crumbling remains of the pyramid

Owing to the poor condition of the monument, information about its dimensions and appearance contains a degree of imprecision. The pyramid had a base length of about 78.5 m (258 ft; 149.8 cu) to 78.75 m (258.4 ft; 150.29 cu) converging at either 50° 11′ 40′′ or 50°30′ towards the apex between 47 m (154 ft; 90 cu) and 48 m (157 ft; 92 cu) high. The architects made a notable error in demarcating the base, causing the southeast corner to extend 1.58 m (5.2 ft) too far east. Consequently, it is not square. A ditch was left in the pyramid's north face during construction, which allowed workers to build the inner corridor and chambers while the core was being erected around it, before filling it in with rubble.

The pyramid is surrounded by a limestone paved courtyard, except where the mortuary temple sits, and is accessed from the temple's north and south wings. Enclosing the courtyard is a tall, rounded enclosure wall 3.15 m (10.3 ft; 6.01 cu) at its thickest.

=== Substructure ===
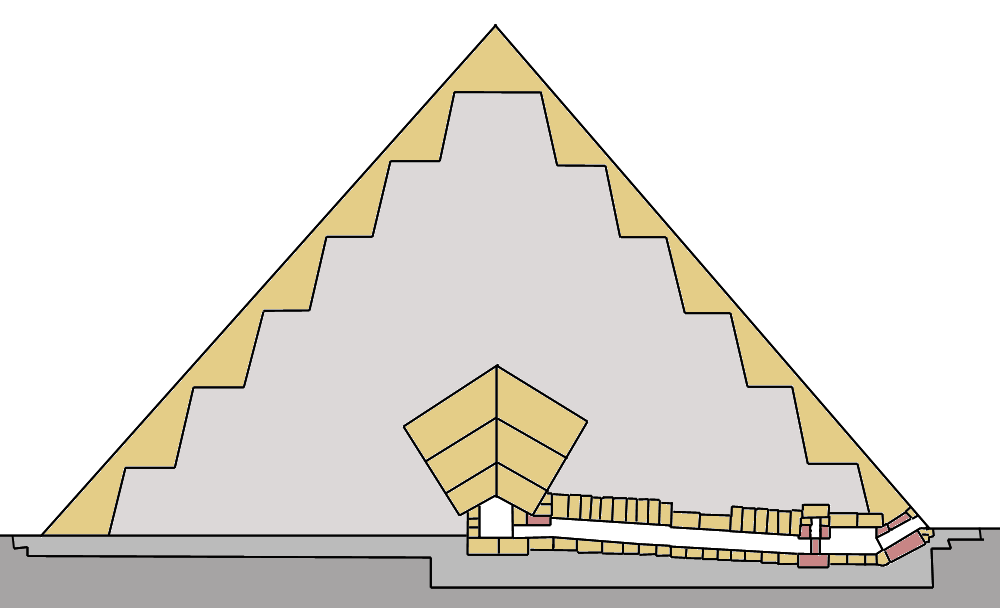
North–south cross-section of the pyramid. fine Tura limestone red granite crude limestone foundation bedrock

The substructure access is located slightly above ground on the pyramid's north face. A short descending corridor – lined with granite – leads into a vestibule, beyond which the route is guarded by a pink granite portcullis, with granite-lined walls on either side. The corridor is 4.25 m (14 ft) long sloped at 24° 48′, with a passage 1.27 m (4.2 ft) wide and 1.87 m (6.1 ft) high. The corridor following – lined with limestone – begins with a slight ascent becoming horizontal – lined with granite – just before its terminus. The ascending portion is 22.3 m (73 ft) long with a slope of 5°, while the horizontal section is 3.1 m (10 ft) long.

Precise reconstruction of the substructure plan has been rendered impossible by the extensive damage that stone thieves have wrought on the chambers. Sources have differed on whether the funerary apartment – estimated to be 12.6 m (41 ft) east–west by 3.15 m (10.3 ft) north–south – consists of a single or dual chambers. Clearance of the substructure has confirmed that the funerary apartment comprised two rooms, with the burial chamber still to be investigated. The antechamber lies on the vertical axis of the pyramid, occupying 14.9 m^{2} (160 ft^{2}) of space, with the burial chamber to its west. The chambers had a ceiling constructed from three gabled layers of limestone blocks, which dispersed the weight from the superstructure onto either side of the passageway preventing collapse. Perring estimated the largest blocks to be 10.6 m (35 ft; 20.2 cu) long, 3 m (9.8 ft; 5.7 cu) wide and 4 m (13 ft; 7.6 cu) thick. Despite their size and weight, all but two have been broken.

A conservation project led by Egyptologist Mohamed Ismail Khaled has begun work to stabilize the pyramid's substructure. During the restoration of the antechamber, the team rediscovered a low eastern passageway – originally mentioned by John Shae Perring during his exploration in 1836; rejected by later archaeologists, especially Ludwig Borchardt in 1907. The work revealed eight storage chambers used for royal funerary equipment, altering previous understandings of Fifth Dynasty pyramid interior layouts.

Inside the apartment's ruins, Perring found stone fragments – the only discovered remains of the burial – which he believed belonged to the king's basalt sarcophagus.

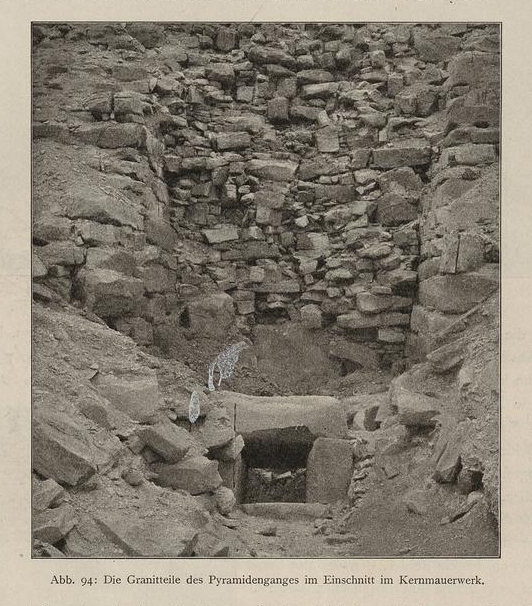
Entryway into the pyramid substructure

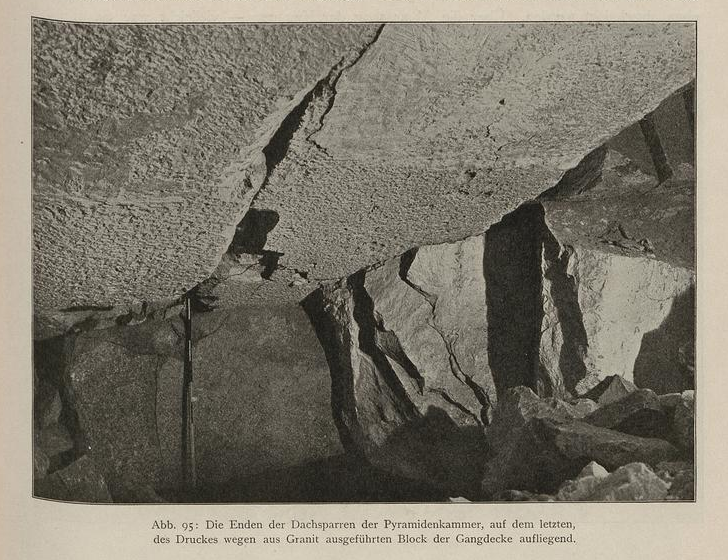
Limestone gable of the chamber ceiling

=== Valley temple ===
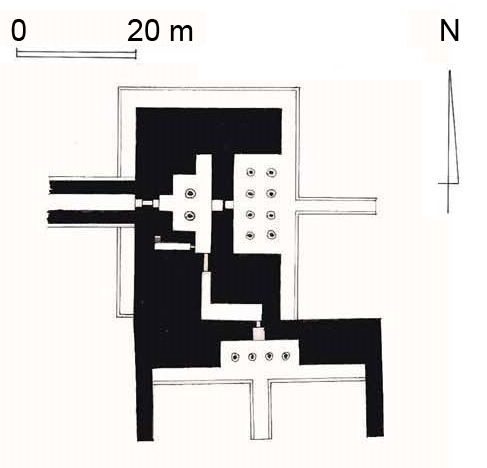
Valley temple layout

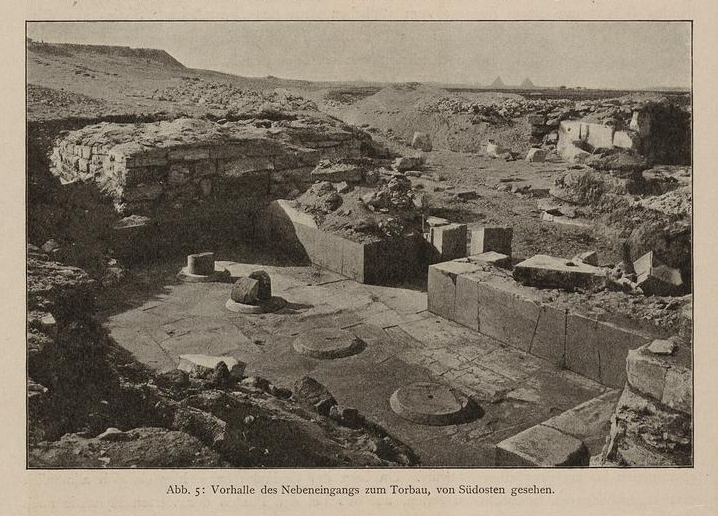
Ruined side entrance

Sahure's now-ruined valley temple was situated on the shore of Abusir lake, on the edge of the desert. It had a rectangular ground plan 32 m (105 ft; 61 cu) long by 24 m (79 ft; 46 cu) wide and oriented on the north–south axis. Its base is now around 5 m (16 ft) below ground level, which has risen over the millennia due to the accumulation of silt deposits during the annual Nile flood. The temple's walls slope inwards as they rise, their corners are formed into a convex torus mould up to a cavetto cornice with its own horizontal torus mould.

The temple had two entrances. Its main entrance, in the east, consisted of a landing ramp leading to a column-adorned portico. Its floor was paved with polished basalt, its walls had a red granite dado above which was limestone decorated with bas-relief, and it had a blue-painted limestone ceiling decorated with relief-carved golden stars representing the entrance into the Duat. The columns were formed into date palms, with leaves tied vertically to form capitals, and each column bore the king's titulary and name carved into the stone and painted green. An alternative entrance was built on the south side, accessed by a canal leading to a ramp up to another columned portico, this time containing four red granite columns. The columns, in contrast, were cylindrical in form and lacked any crown. This portico was also less deep and was paved with limestone. It remains unclear why this entrance was built. The wall may belong to Sahure's pyramid town, named 'The soul of Sahure comes forth in glory'.

The entrances were connected by passages to a T-shaped hall equipped with two columns. The room has a transverse space with a narrowed recess in its rear wall containing the two columns, followed by an even narrower recess in the first's rear wall. The room was originally adorned with polychromatic relief, and contained a scene depicting the king, as a sphinx or griffin, trampling captive Near Eastern and Libyan enemies led to him by the gods. The room connects to two others: a room with a staircase up to the roof terrace at the south end, and the causeway at its rearmost recess.

A relief depiction of troops from Sahure's valley temple can be contrasted with similar imagery in Userkaf's complex. In Sahure's scene, the soldiers are carved with near identical postures, a stark contrast to Userkaf's confused arrangement of overlapping figures. The latter has greater dynamism inducing more interest, whilst the former is more readily understood. The monotony of Sahure's scene was balanced by craftsmen introducing detail in the musculature and facial features of the figures.

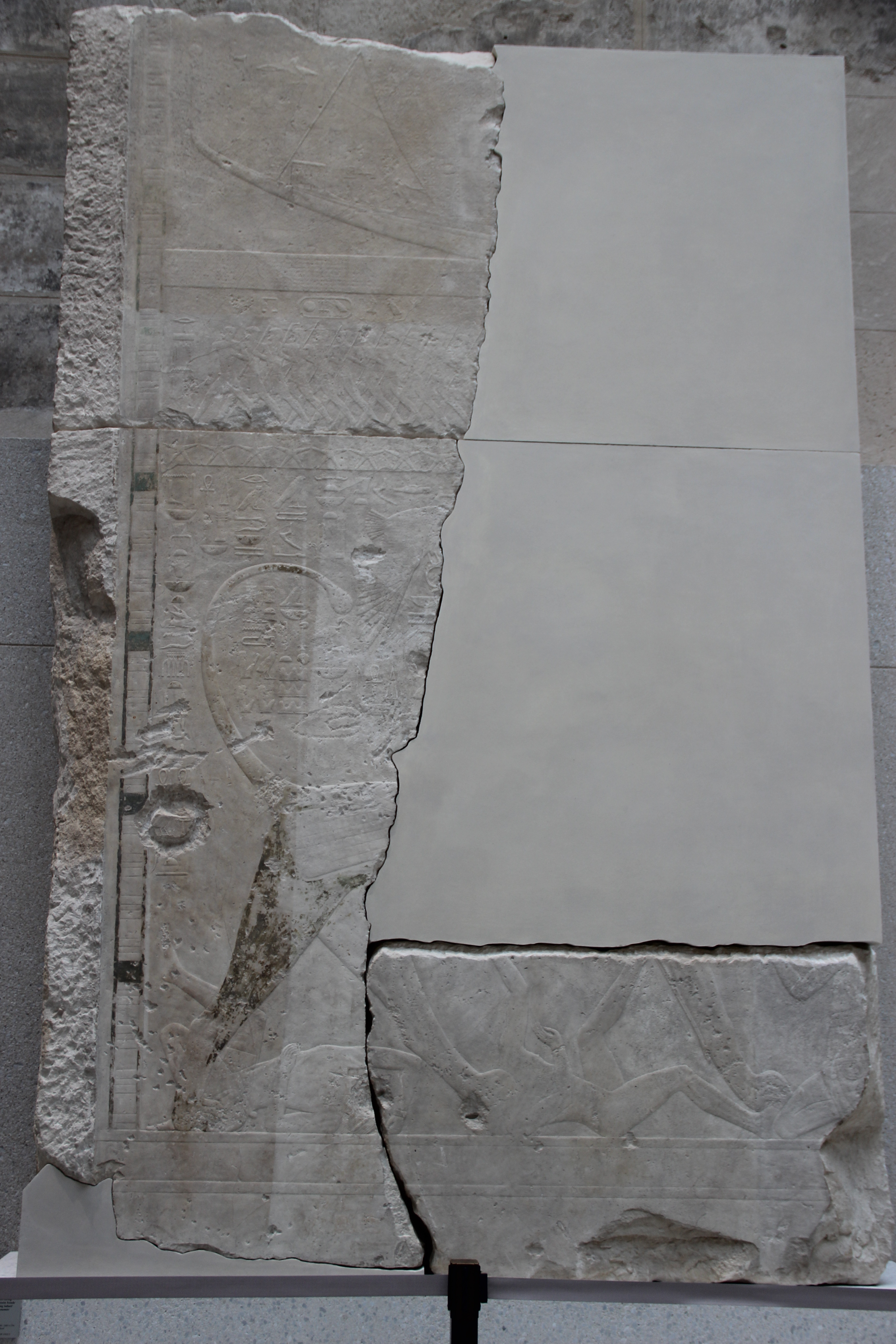
Fragmentary relief of Sahure in the form of a sphinx trampling Egypt's enemies

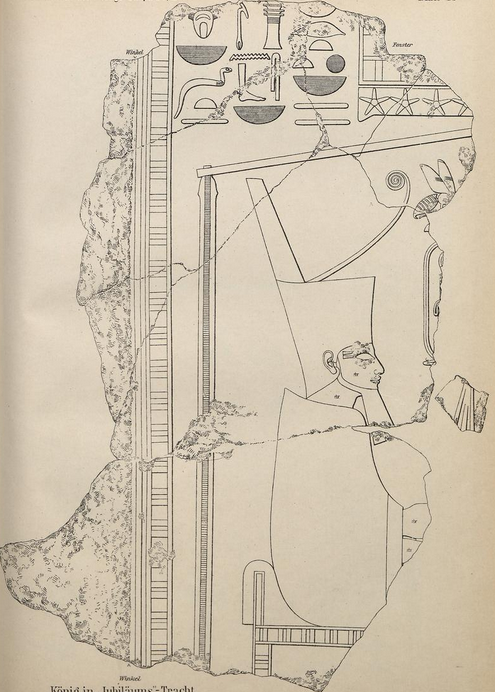
Drawing of a relief of Sahure wearing the tunic of the Sed festival and Deshret of Lower Egypt.

=== Causeway ===
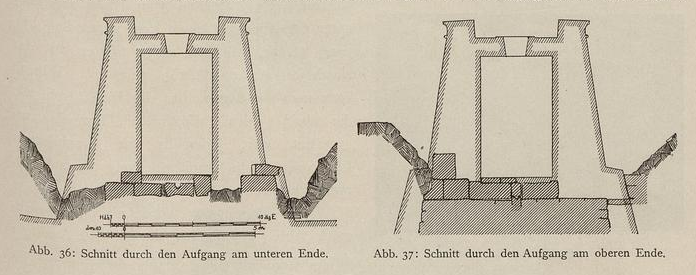
Cross-section of the causeway

A 235 m (771 ft; 448 cu) long, slightly inclined limestone causeway connected the valley temple to the mortuary temple. The causeway was roofed, with narrow slits left in the ceiling slabs allowing light to enter, illuminating its polychromatic bas-relief covered walls. These included scenes with seemingly apotropaic functions, such as a scene of the king represented as a sphinx crushing Egypt's enemies under his paw. Other scenes presented include offering bearers, animal slaughter, and the transport of the gilded pyramidion to the construction site. Only the base of the causeway, made of large limestone blocks, has been preserved.

The scene depicting emaciated nomads, reduced through starvation, to skin and bone had important historical implications. The scene was thought only to exist in Unas' causeway, and was thus believed to be unique eyewitness testimony to the declining living standards of Saharan nomads brought about by the end of the Sahara wet phase in the middle of the 3rd millennium BC. The discovery of an identical scene in Sahure's causeway casts doubt onto this hypothesis. Instead, Miroslav Verner suggests that the nomads might have been brought into the pyramid town to demonstrate the hardships faced by builders bringing higher-quality stone from remote mountain areas.

A second discovered scene has implications for Fifth Dynasty genealogy. (Note: Deciphering the origins and genealogy of the Fifth Dynasty has been a complex problem for historians due to the dearth and ambiguity of available historical sources. In the Westcar Papyrus the first three kings of the Fifth Dynasty – Userkaf, Sahure and Neferirkare – are described as brothers born of the union of Re and Redjedet, the wife of a priest of Re in Sakhebu. The relationship between the founder of the Fifth Dynasty, Userkaf, and his predecessors is unclear. He is traditionally viewed as the son of Neferhetepes, and thus a grandson of Djedefre. Userkaf's wife is believed to be Khentkaus I, daughter of Menkaure and 'mother of the two kings of Upper and Lower Egypt' Sahure and Neferirkare. Sahure thus appears to have been succeeded by his brother, instead of his eldest son, Netjerirenre. Neferirkare had two sons with Khentkaus II, 'mother of two kings of Upper and Lower Egypt' Neferefre and Nyuserre. The identity of an ephemeral ruler, Shepseskare, is unknown, but his reign is placed between either Neferirkare and Neferefre, or Neferefre and Nyuserre.) In this scene, Sahure is surrounded by his family in the palace garden Wtỉs-nfrw-Sꜣhw-rꜥ meaning 'Extolled is Sahure's beauty'. The image confirms the identity of Sahure's consort, Meretnebty, and his twin sons, Ranefer and Netjerirenre. Ranefer, who is depicted closer to Sahure and bears the titles 'king's son' and 'chief lector-priest', may have been Sahure's eldest son, ascending to the throne as Neferirkare. Netjerirenre may be the ephemeral ruler Shepseskare, who took the throne after Neferefre's early death. (Note: Miroslav Verner and Miroslav Bárta suggest the following lineage for the Fifth Dynasty: Khentkaus I with an unknown partner has two sons, Shepseskaf and Userkaf. Userkaf with his consort, Neferhetepes, has a son, Sahure. Sahure with his consort, Meretnebty, has twin sons, Ranefer (probably Neferirkare) and Netjerirenre. Neferirkare with his consort, Khentkaus II, has two sons, Neferefre and Nyuserre. The identity of Shepseskare remains unclear, though he may plausibly have been Netjerirenre or a son of Neferefre with a wife Khentkaus III, whose tomb was found south of Neferefre's mortuary temple.)

Another important relief discovered depicts a procession of ships, led by the king, being moored at an unidentified location. The relief originated on the causeway south wall, and although the location depicted cannot be identified, a corresponding relief on the same wall depicts the king, his mother and wife, awaiting the arrival of ships carrying myriad goods from the land of Punt – particular emphasis was placed on the Commiphora myrrha trees (nht n ꜥntw). Sahure's is the earliest recorded voyage taken by the Egyptians to Punt acquiring myrrh, electrum and wood from there.

Sahure is further depicted extracting myrrh with an adze from the tree in one scene, and banqueting with his family, including his sons, and officials near the tree in another. The trees depicted may not be Commiphora myrrha, as the use of an adze to extract resin was typically reserved for the Boswellia tree, and moreover the colour of the resin in Sahure's scene was identified by the Egyptologist Tarek El-Awady as yellowish brown, like Boswellia frankincense, and not red, like myrrh.

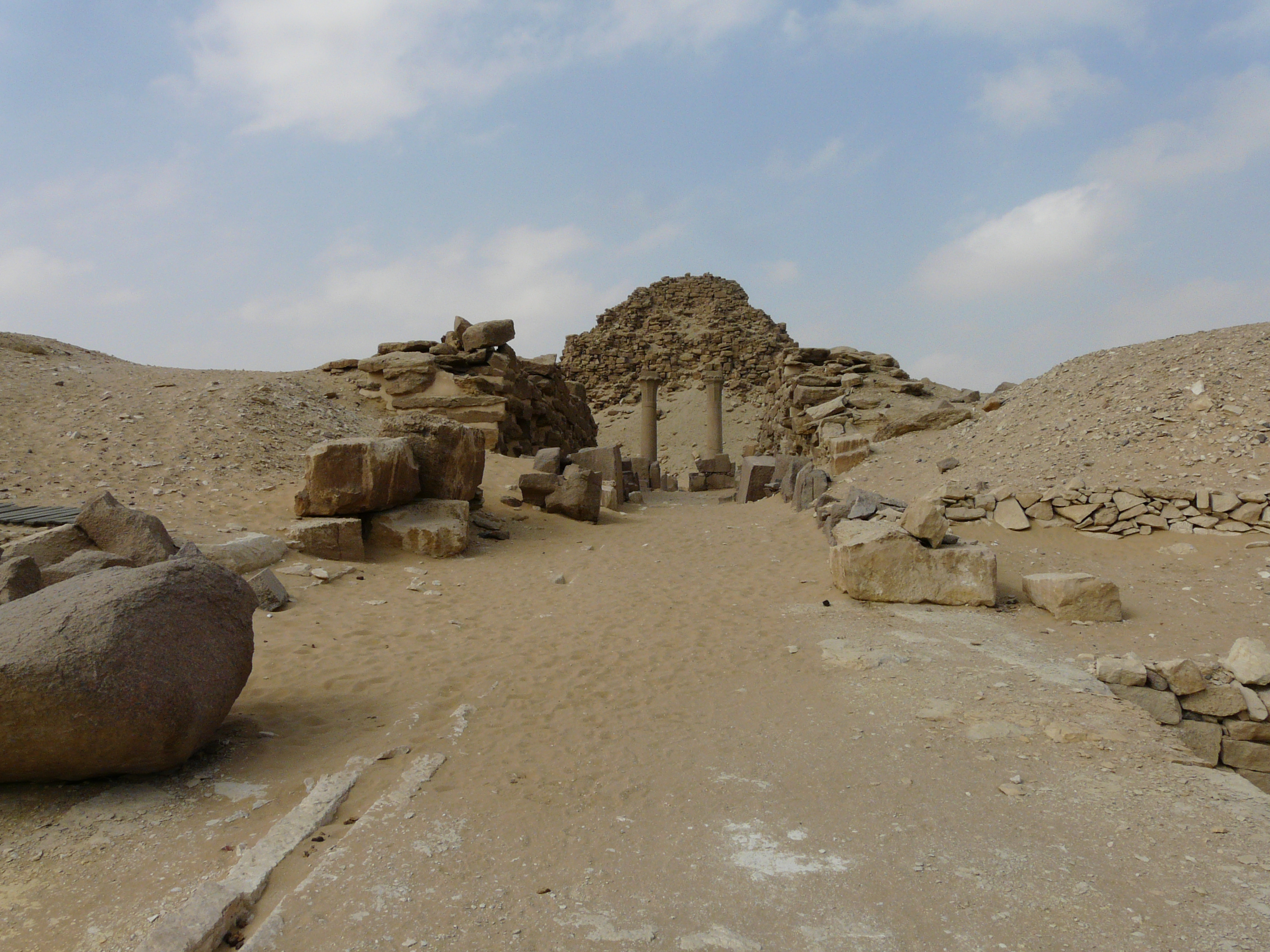
Causeway leading to the mortuary temple

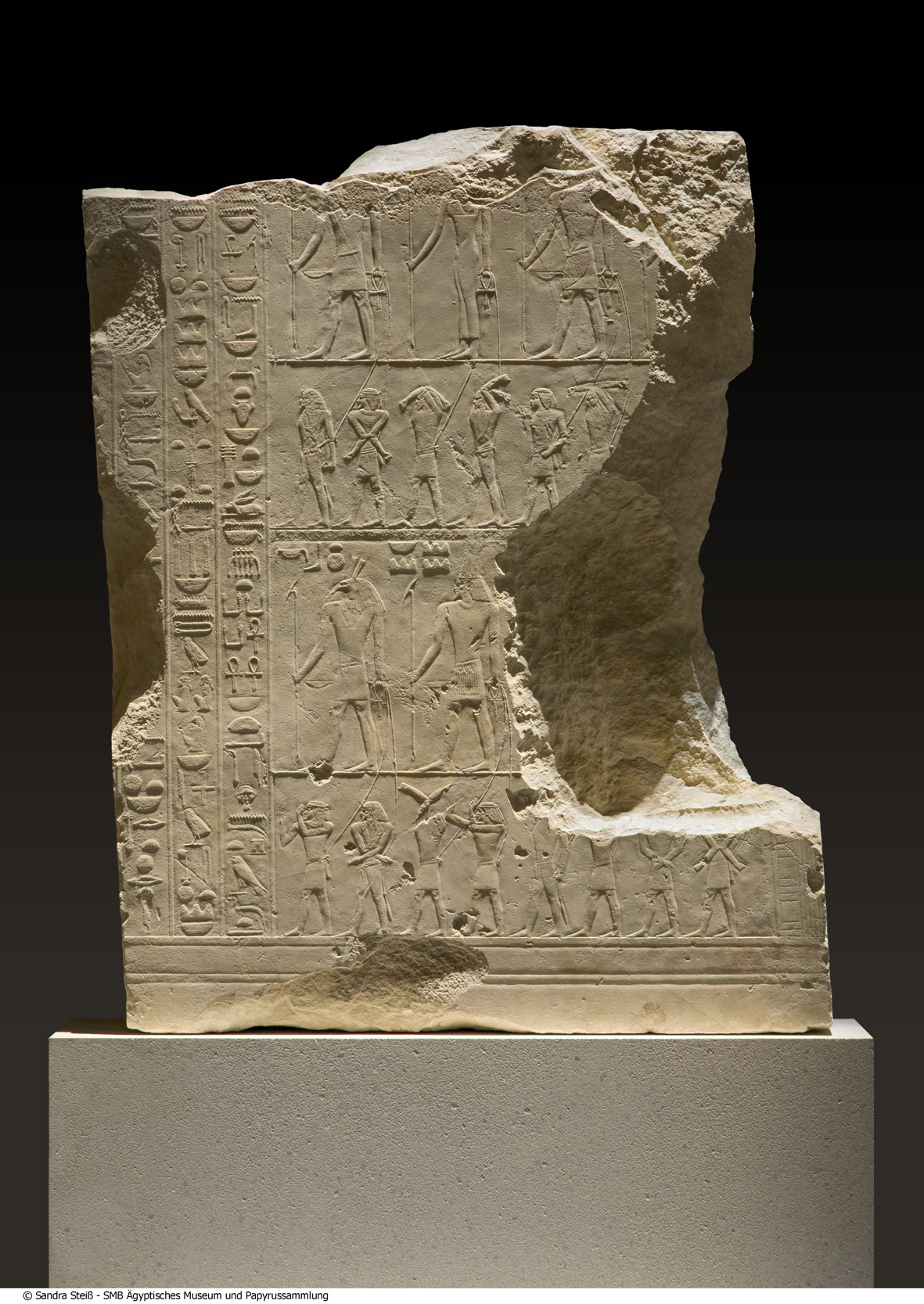
Captured enemies being marched to the temple by Set and Sopdu

=== Mortuary temple ===
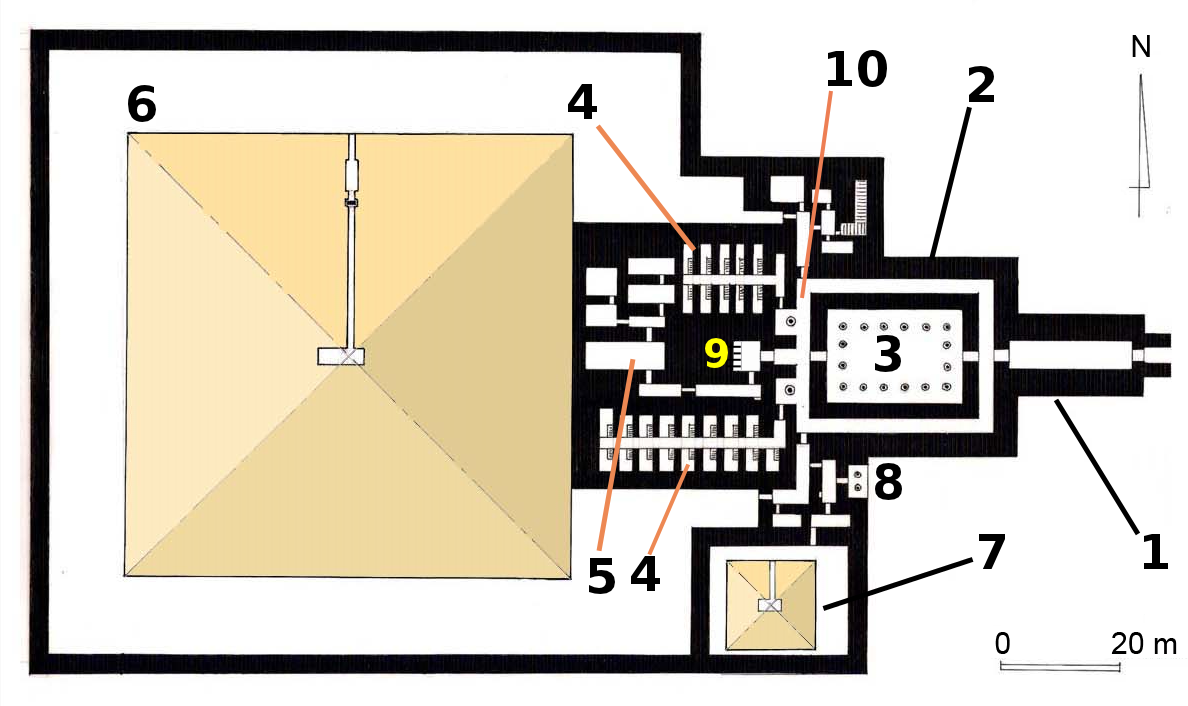
Layout of Sahure's mortuary temple. In order: 1) entrance hall; 2) corridor; 3) courtyard; 4) storage galleries; 5) offering hall; 6) main pyramid; 7) cult pyramid enclosure; 8) side entrance; 9) statue chapel; 10) transverse corridor

The mortuary temple was an expansive, rectangular building positioned along the east–west axis, and situated on a level surface built from two layers of limestone blocks in front of the main pyramid's east face. The outer façade was inclined at 82° up to a cavetto cornice with torus mould. In its layout, Sahure's mortuary temple represented the 'conceptual beginning' of all subsequent such temples of the Old Kingdom. It contained five basic elements, exemplified in the temple of Khafre: an entrance hall, an open courtyard, a five-niche statue chapel, an offering hall, and storerooms. The dominant building material used in its construction, here as elsewhere, was limestone, but substantial valuable materials such as red and black granite, alabaster and basalt were also incorporated.

==== Entrance hall ====
The transition between causeway and temple was marked by a large granite gate leading into the mortuary temple's entrance hall. In the Fifth Dynasty, it was of the standard size of 21 m (69 ft; 40 cu) long, 5.25 m (17.2 ft; 10.02 cu) wide, and 6.8 m (22 ft; 13.0 cu) tall. The hall has suffered considerably, rendering a precise reconstruction impracticable. It had a limestone floor, its walls had red granite dado above which was, probably, limestone decorated with painted bas-relief scenes, and it was covered by a stone barrel vault ceiling which had slits in its tympanum allowing the enclosure to be dimly lit. Contemporary sources identify this room as the pr-wrw meaning 'House of the Great Ones', and it may be a replica of the hall of the royal palace, where nobles were received and certain rituals performed. At its end, a granite doorway led to a closed corridor surrounding an open courtyard.

==== Corridor ====
The corridor was paved with basalt, and its walls had a 1.57 m (5.2 ft; 3.00 cu) granite dado, above which they were decorated with colourful relief. The north wall contains scenes depicting the king fishing and hunting wildfowl, while on the south wall he is depicted hunting – antelopes, gazelles, deer and other horned animals are shepherded into an enclosure for the king to shoot with his bow and arrow, after which hound dogs seize and kill the animals, elsewhere hyenas are observed poaching, and hedgehogs and jerboa scatter into their holes – whilst his courtiers observe. A masterful depth of detail has been incorporated into the latter scene, which measured 8 m (26 ft) long by 3 m (9.8 ft) high. The sedate posture of the king's courtiers, representing order, is juxtaposed against the mass of wounded and frightened animals depicted in a variety of postures and facing various directions, representing chaos. The imposing figure that is Sahure is unrivalled in any other example, and the gruesome detail of the injured animals is unreplicated. The figure of a hyena, pawing at an arrow in its jaw, reappears frequently in the Middle and New Kingdom, an homage to the relief from Sahure's temple. Ptahhotep's tomb in Saqqara contains an abridged, and slightly less skilfully executed, copy of this hunting scene.

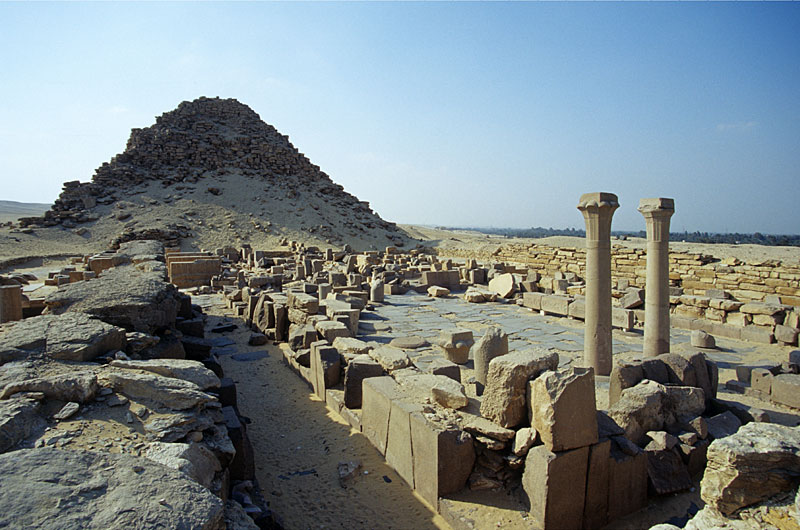
South corridor – site of the hunting relief – relative to the pyramid complex

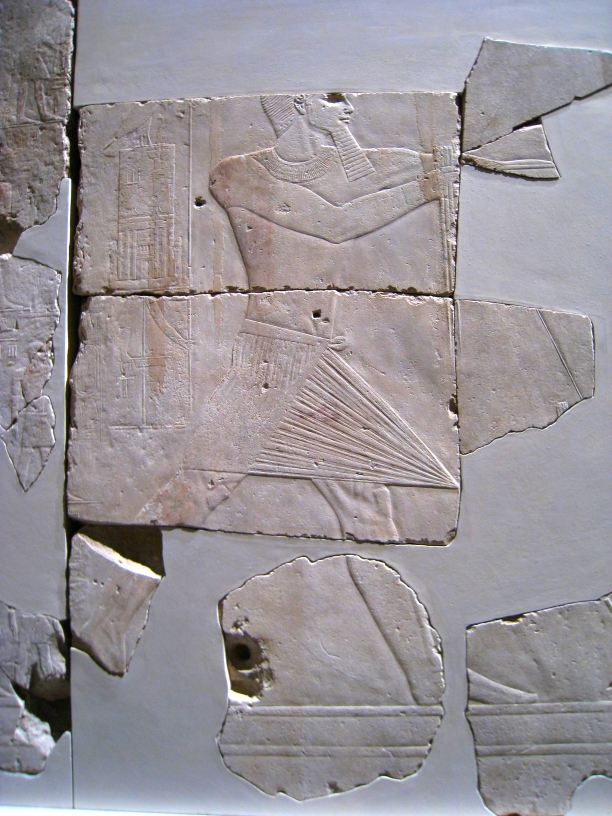
Sahure hunting with his courtiers behind him, including his successor Neferirkare (Note: The figure of Neferirkare is in the far left side at about the middle. In front of him is a short inscription which bears nsw-bỉt nfr-ỉr-kꜣ-rꜥ dỉ ꜥnḫ ḏt meaning 'King of Upper and Lower Egypt, Neferirkare, given life forever' with his name enclosed in a small cartouche.)

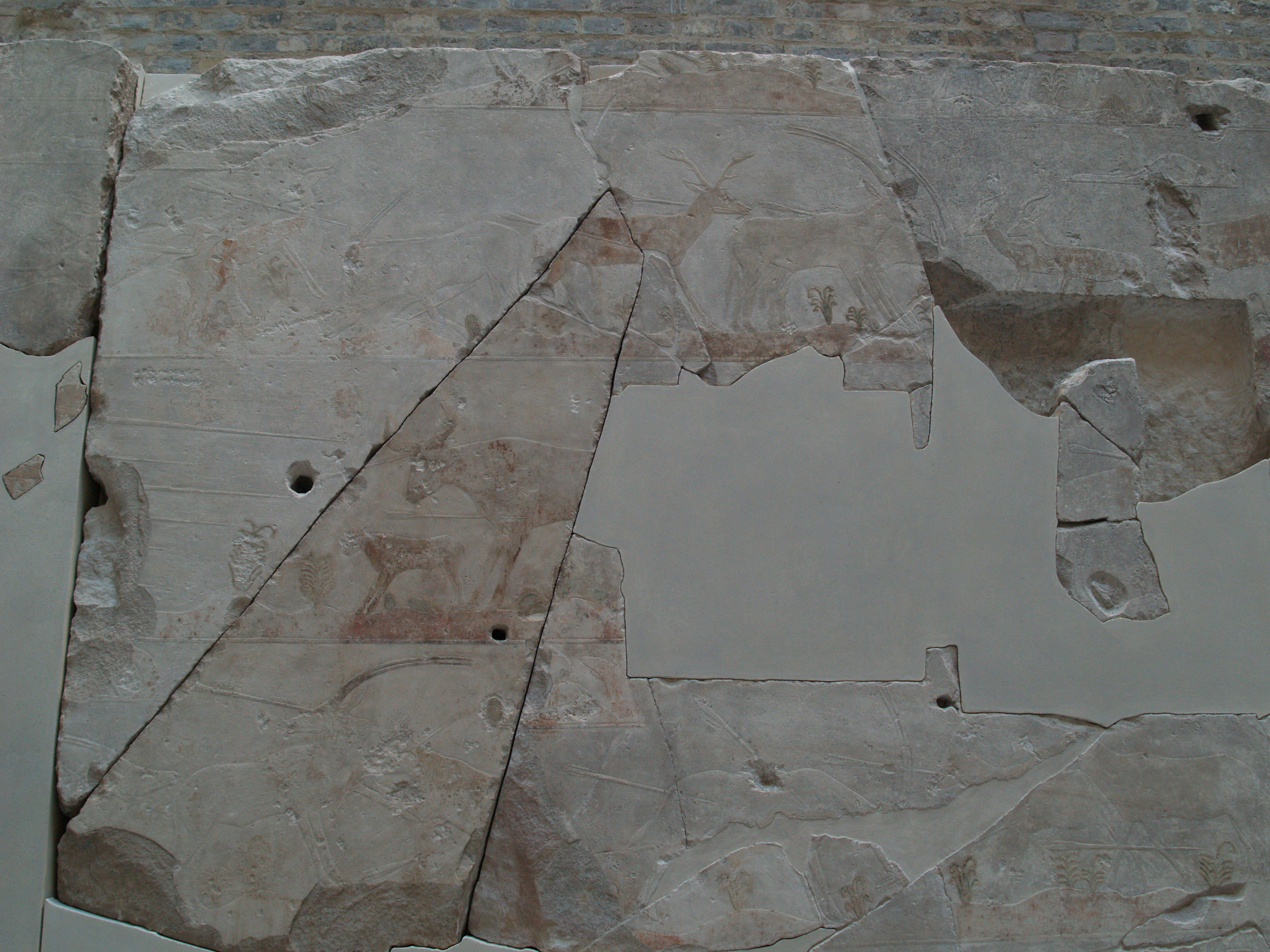
Herded animals being slain by Sahure or poached by predators

The Egyptologist Mark Lehner suggests that the corridor represented the untamed wilderness, surrounding a clearing – the open courtyard – of which the king was guarantor. From the reliefs depicting ships on the east corridor's west wall and west corridor's (transverse corridor) east wall, the Egyptologist Dorothea Arnold contends that the courtyard and corridor form an architectural unit analogous to the Egyptian benben myth. The other reliefs present symbolize the king's role as guarantor of order and prosperity on the sacred island. An important discovery was made on the reliefs of the room: The titulary of one of the present subjects was modified to include the inscription nsw-bỉt Nfr-ỉrỉ-kꜣ-rꜥ meaning 'King of Upper and Lower Egypt Neferirkare'. From this detail, Kurt Sethe, who was responsible for compiling and preparing the scenes for publication, proposed the hypothesis that Neferirkare and Sahure were brothers, and that Neferirkare had had the reliefs altered after ascending to the throne.

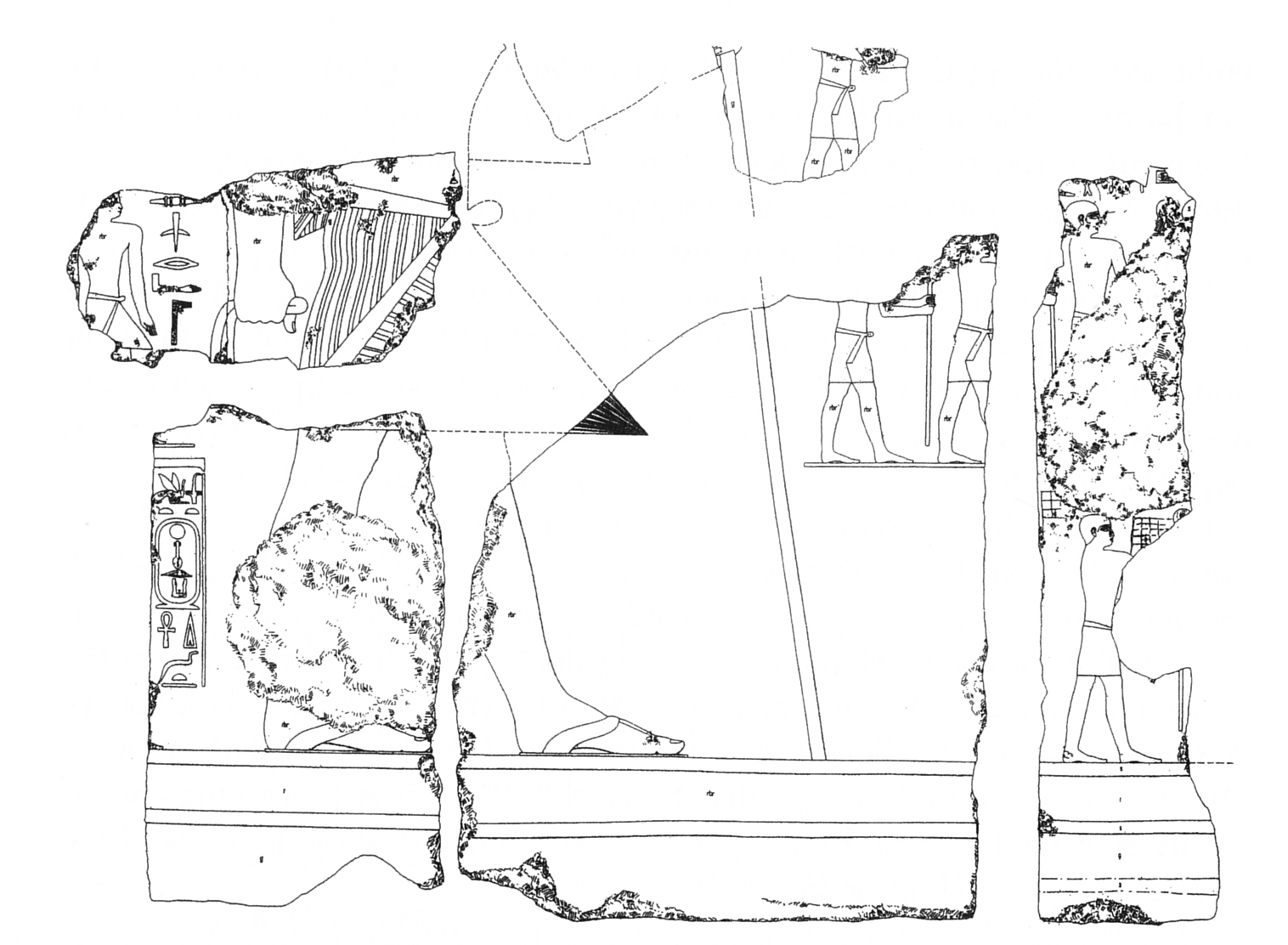
East corridor

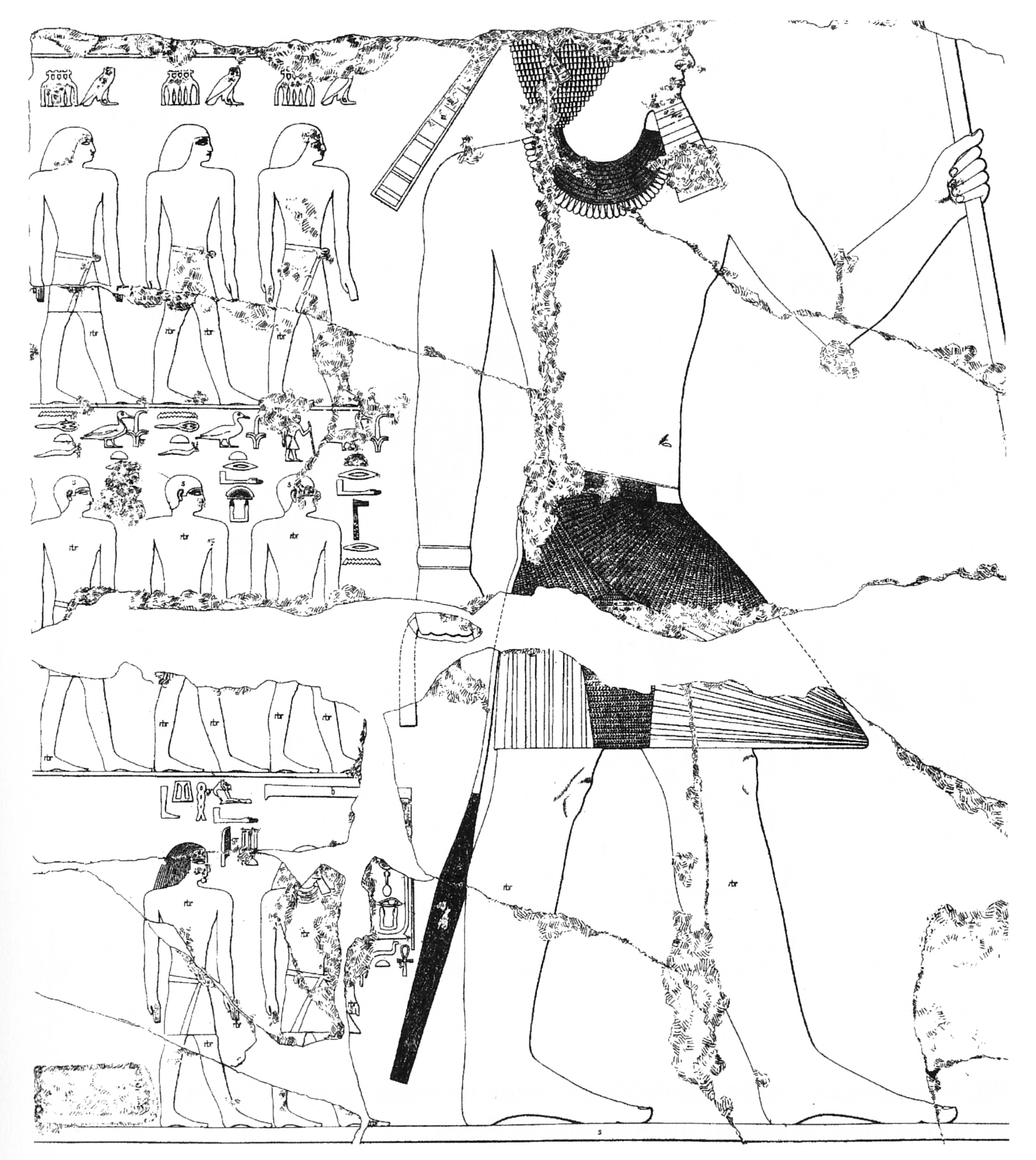
South corridor

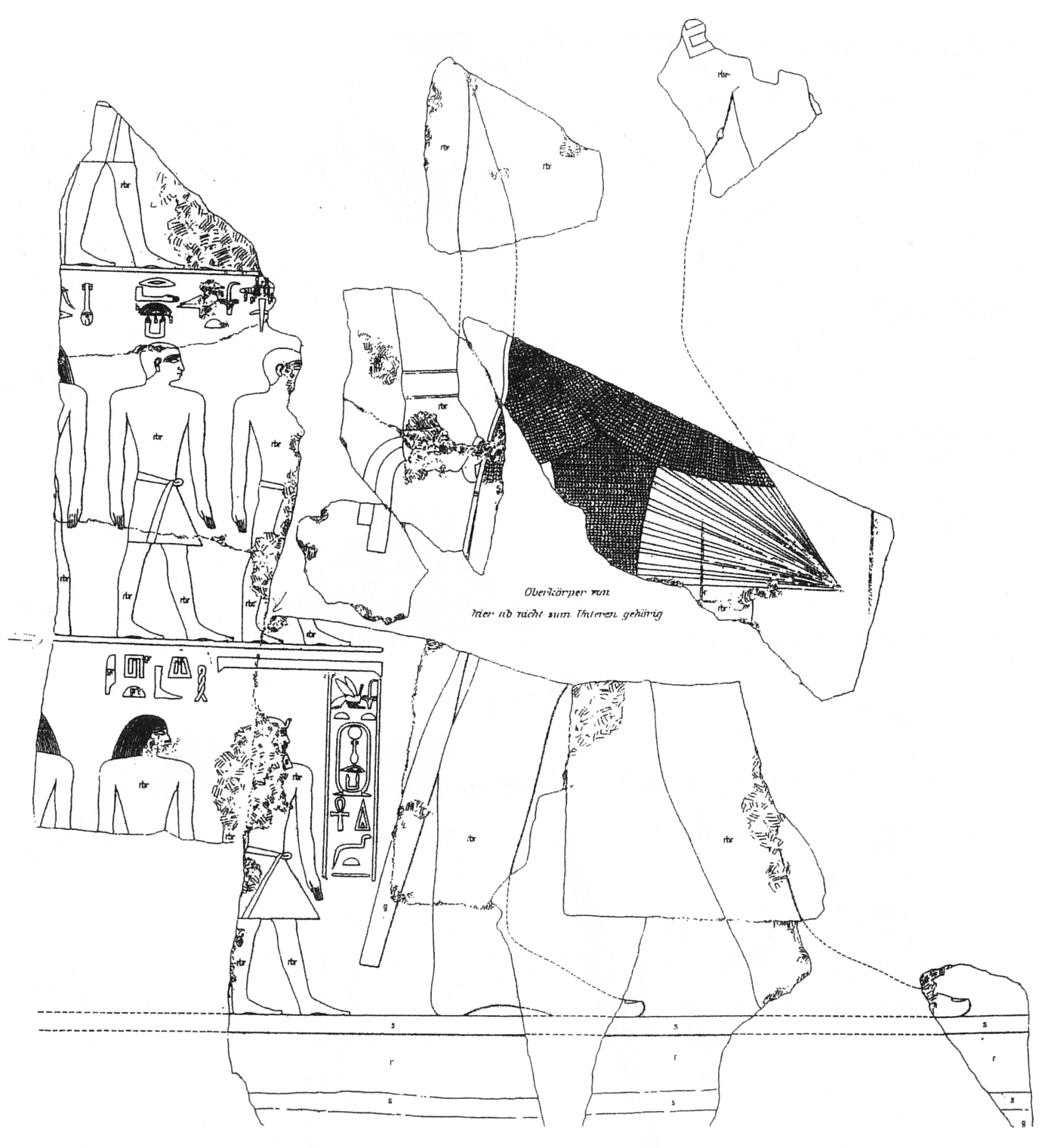
South corridor

Drawings of relief fragments from the corridor altered during Neferirkare's reign.

==== Courtyard ====
The open courtyard was paved with polished basalt and lined with sixteen red granite columns, supporting the roof of an ambulatory. Aside from an alabaster altar in the north-west corner decorated with scenes of sacrifice, the open courtyard is bare, though it originally had statues of the pharaoh placed between the columns, and may once also have contained statues of kneeling captives. Eleven of the original sixteen granite columns were found in the temple. Each was 6.4 m (21 ft) tall, and carved into the form of date palms, symbolising fertility and immortality, upon which the king's name and titulary was inscribed and painted in green. The Two Ladies appear on these columns as well: Nekhbet, the vulture goddess, in the south half representing Upper Egypt, and Wadjet, the cobra goddess, in the north half representing Lower Egypt. Above, a red granite architrave bore the royal titulary, and further supported the limestone ceiling.

The ambulatory's blue painted ceiling was decorated with yellow stars, whilst its limestone walls were decorated with polychrome bas-reliefs, fragments of which have been preserved, depicting the king's victory over his enemies – on the north wall Near Eastern peoples, on the south Libyans – and the acquired spoils. In a particular scene, showing the capture of animals, supplementary inscriptions identify the quantities seized: '123,440 head of cattle, 223,400 asses, 232,413 deer, and 243,688 sheep'. In another scene, the family of a Libyan chief beg for his life to be spared whilst the king prepares to execute him. Under the northern ambulatory, a relief of exemplary craftsmanship depicting precious oil vases and Syrian brown bears was found. The figures were given rounded edges so that they simultaneously blend in with the background and stand out clearly. Much of the paint used has been preserved: a dark red-brown colour was used for the vase and a yellow-brown for the bear's fur. Up to a further eleven scenes remain too fragmentary to be reconstructed.

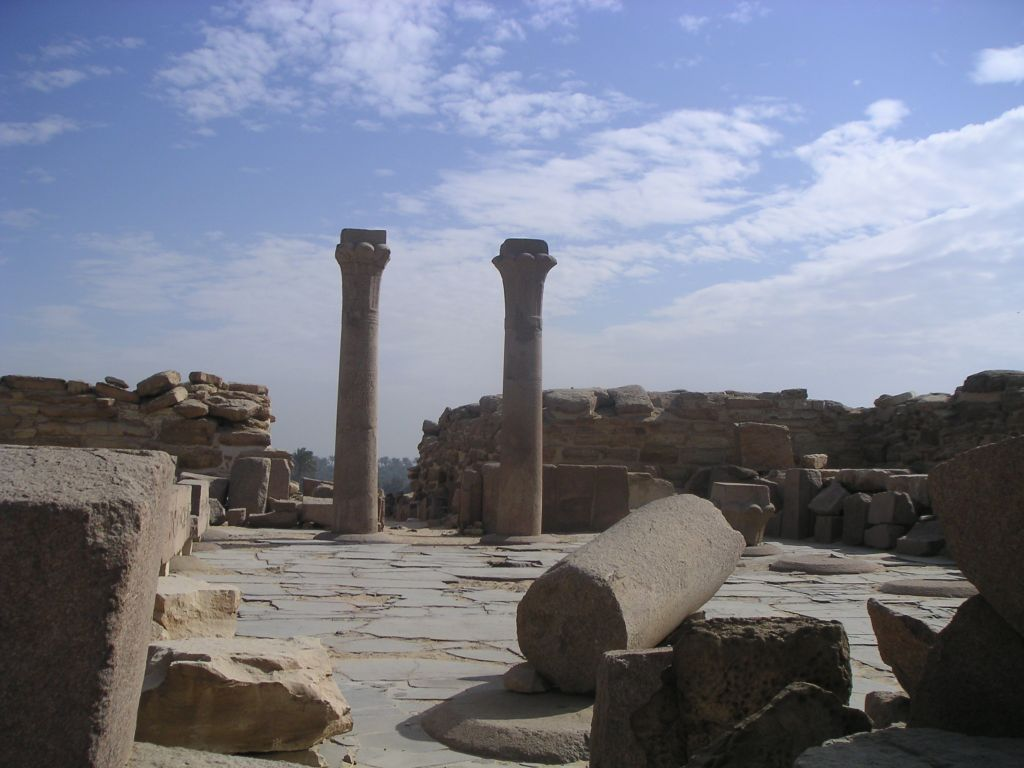
Basalt paving of the courtyard

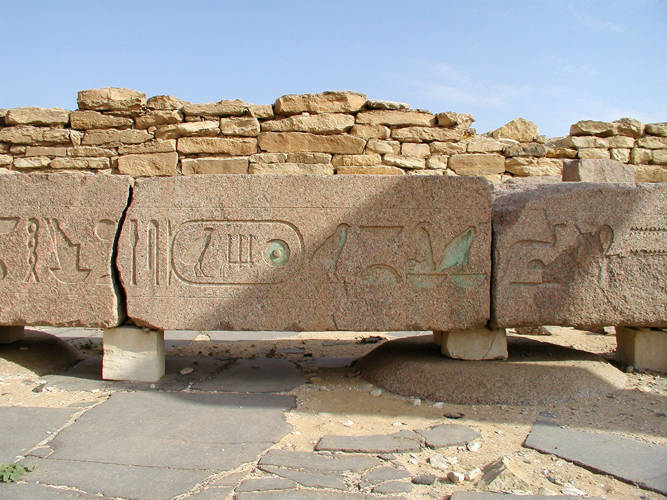
Remnant of the massive granite architrave inscribed with Sahure's titulary

Depiction of Sahure's mortuary temple as it appeared in the Old Kingdom

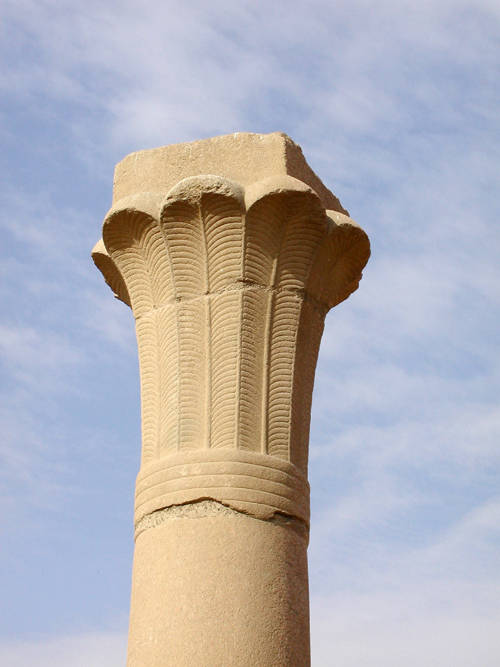
Palmiform capital of a column

==== Transverse corridor and storage galleries ====
Beyond the courtyard is a transverse (north–south) corridor which separates the public outer from the private inner temple, which only priests were allowed to access. The corridor further served as an intersection connecting the outer and inner temples, the courtyard surrounding the pyramid, and the cult pyramid. At its northern end was a staircase up to the roof terrace. Its floor was paved with basalt, as the courtyard was, and its walls had a granite dado, above which was limestone decorated with bas-relief. On the north half of the corridor's east wall is a relief, considered by the Egyptologist Iorwerth Eiddon Stephen Edwards to be amongst the most interesting in the temple, that depicts the king and his court observing the departure of twelve sea-going vessels, probably on expedition to Syria or Palestine. In the south-half, a similar scene depicts the king and his court awaiting the arrival of ships laden with cargo and several Near Eastern peoples, who do not appear to be prisoners, indicating either a commercial or, perhaps, diplomatic mission. In the centre of the west wall of the corridor was an alabaster staircase that led into the five-niche statue chapel.

Flanking the staircase were two deep niches, each containing two granite papyriform columns 3.65 m (12 ft) high. The columns supported an architrave, a fragment of which has been found in the oil press of St. Jeremiah monastery in Saqqara. The niche's walls were decorated with reliefs depicting processions of offering bearers, and they had recessed side doors leading to two-story storage galleries. The northern gallery consisted of ten rooms arranged in two rows, each outfitted with its own staircase – cut directly into the limestone walls – leading to the second story. These held cult objects used for the temple rituals. The southern gallery consisted of sixteen or seventeen rooms, also arranged in two rows and outfitted with staircases, that probably held sacrificial offerings. Reliefs in the corridors leading to the galleries even included ritual instructions, such as 'presentation of gold' or 'sealing a box containing incense' found in the north and south corridors respectively.

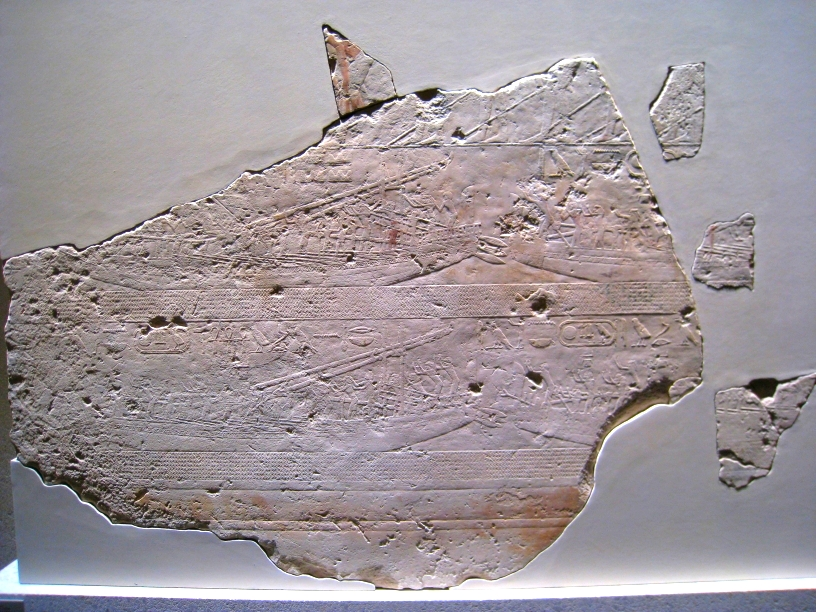
Transverse corridor relief of a returning naval expedition

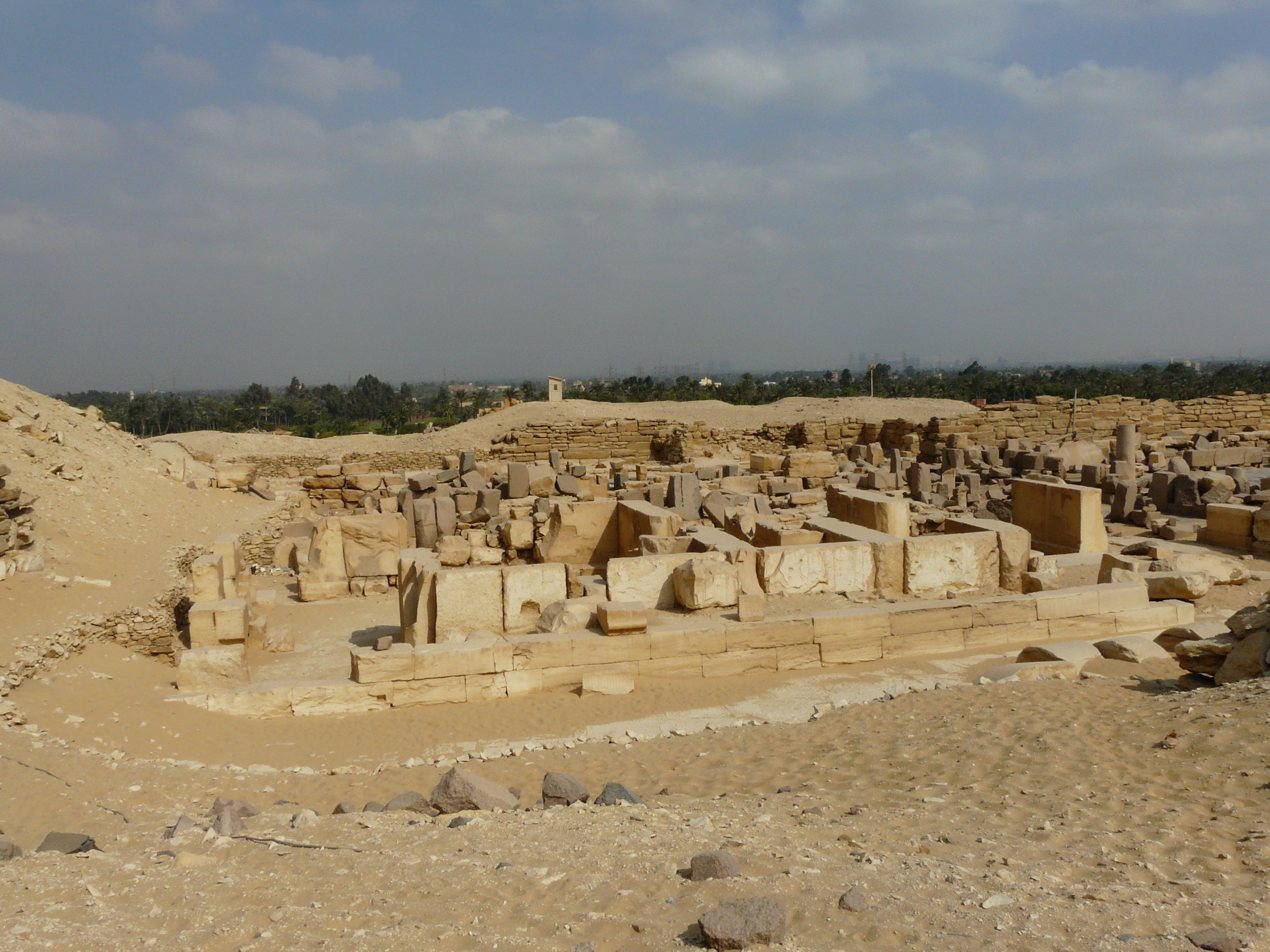
The southern storage gallery where offerings were stored

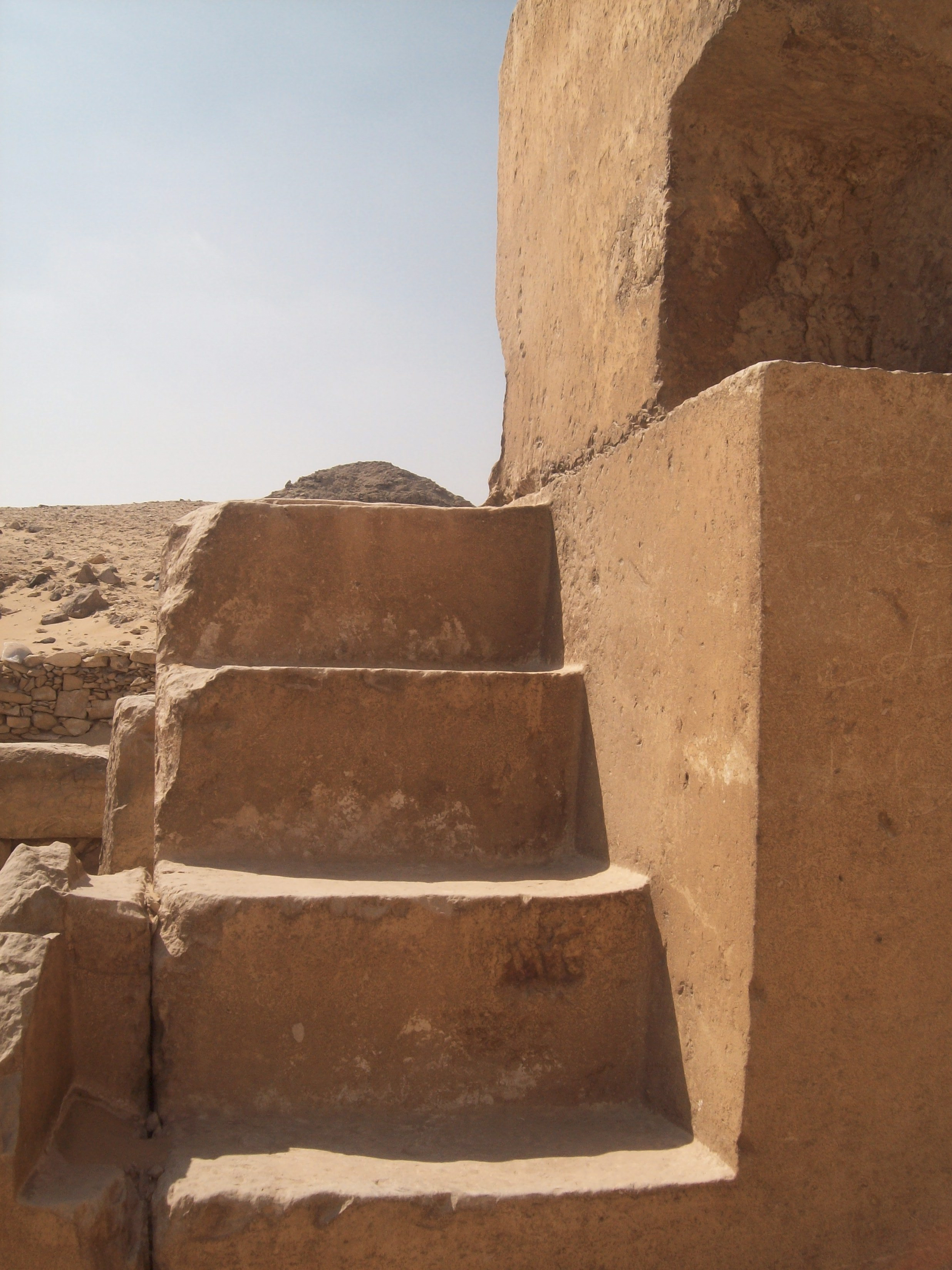
Carved stone steps of a two-story storage room

==== Statue chapel ====
The transverse corridor staircase leads into the five-niche statue chapel, a room with considerable religious importance. Accessed through a double-door, it had a floor paved with white alabaster, red granite sheathing in the niches and dado, fine white limestone sheathed walls elsewhere which was lavishly decorated in relief, and a limestone ceiling decorated with stars evoking the night sky of the Duat. A small staircase stood before each niche, which was once occupied by a statue, none of which have been preserved. It was originally assumed that each statue represented one of the king's five names, but the Abusir Papyri, discovered in the nearby pyramid of Neferirkare, indicate otherwise. The papyri identify that the central statue represented the king as Osiris, while the two outermost ones represented him as the king of Upper Egypt, and the king of Lower Egypt. The remaining two are not identified. Exiting the chapel to the south is a path leading through two rooms – including a rectangular vestibule that appears to be a predecessor of the antichambre carrée, first found in Nyuserre's mortuary temple – passing around a great stone massif and into the westernmost room of the temple, the offering hall.

==== Offering hall and auxiliary rooms ====
The offering hall of the temple held the most significance for the royal mortuary cult. The sanctuary was 13.7 m (45 ft; 26 cu) in length and 4.6 m (15 ft; 9 cu) wide. It was entered through a black granite door that opened up to a white alabaster paved floor, and walls with dado of black granite above which was fine white limestone decorated with polychromatic bas-relief depicting divinities bringing offerings to the king, and covered along its length by a vaulted ceiling with painted stars. A low alabaster altar stood at the west wall, at the foot of a granite false door, possibly covered in copper or gold, through which the spirit of the king would enter the room to receive his meal, before returning to his tomb. Unusually, the false door has been crudely fashioned, and bears none of the names, titles, or sacrificial formulas that are expected to be found. This led Borchardt to speculate that the door may have originally been sheathed with metal which was eventually stolen by thieves. The room also originally contained a black granite statue and an offering basin, located in a recessed niche in its south-west corner, with an outflow of copper piping. In the north wall, a granite doorway gives access to five auxiliary rooms, which served the offering hall.

==== Drainage system ====
Sahure's temple had an elaborate drainage system including more than 380 m (1,247 ft) of copper piping. (Note: A section of piping recovered during Borchardt's investigations was tested by Dr. Rathgen. It had a composition of 96.47% copper, 0.18% iron, 3.35% chlorine, oxygen, etc, and traces of arsenic.) Rainfall captured on the roof was funnelled out through stone lion-head spouts fit onto the tops of the outer walls. The choice of the lion-head may relate to the ancient Egyptian belief that Set and other inimical deities could manifest themselves in rain. The lion, a symbolic protector of sacred ground, consumed the harmful spirits and ejected harmless water. Where no roof existed, gaps around the base of the outer walls collected the water, conducting it out using channels cut into the paving. Water and other liquids used in rituals and ceremonies, which had become impure and thus dangerous to touch, were removed using the drainage system. Five stone and copper-plated basins, each with a lead plug to fit the vent, were placed around the inner temple. The first was found in the offering hall, two more were in the auxiliary rooms beyond it, a fourth in the corridor leading up to the offering hall, and the fifth in the northern storage gallery. These were connected via an intricate network of copper pipes laid beneath the temple, which led down the length of the causeway before terminating at an outlet on its southern side.

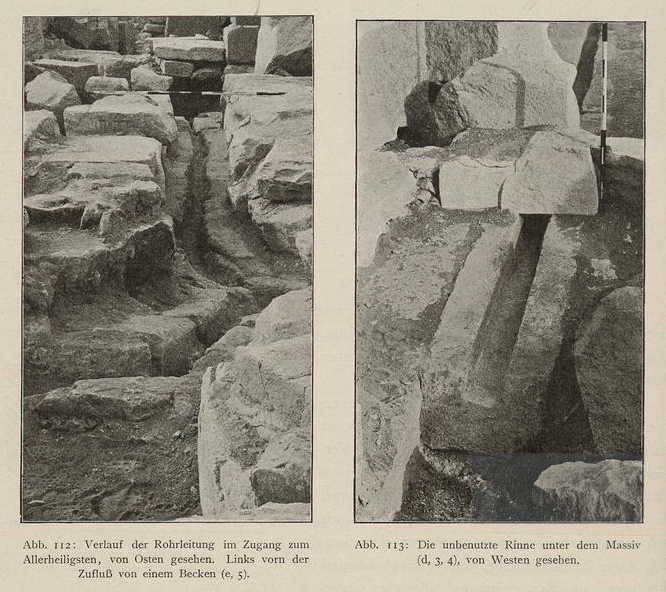
Limestone channels through which water and other liquids were drained

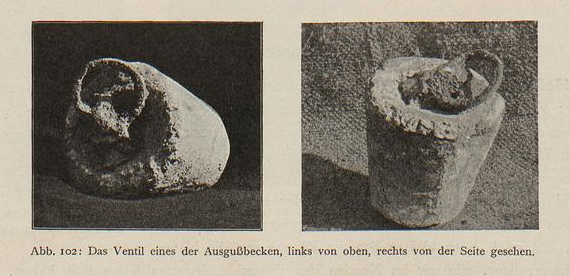
Lead plug of a copper basin from the mortuary temple

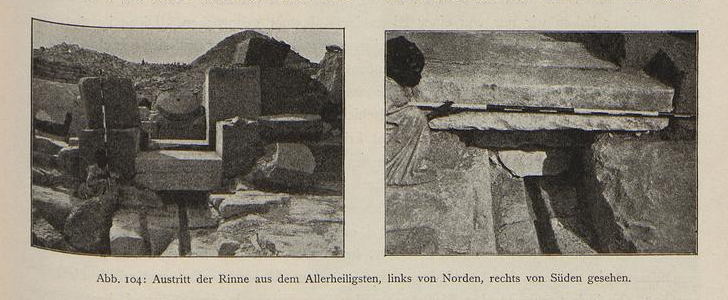
Carved limestone channels departing the offering hall

=== Cult pyramid ===
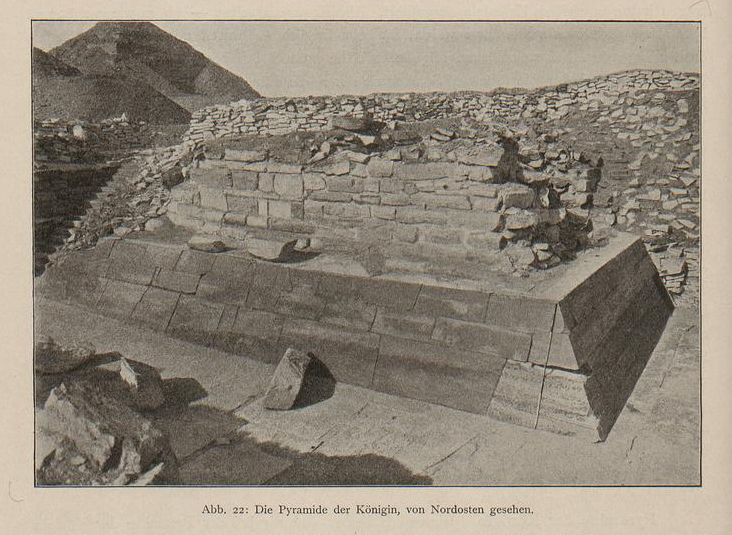
Remnant cult pyramid, with the lowest course of white limestone intact

By the main pyramid's south-east corner, confined to a separate enclosure, lies a cult pyramid. The enclosure is accessed from either the southern end of the transverse corridor, or through a portico – the side entrance to Sahure's mortuary temple – flanked by two granite columns bearing Sahure's royal titulary. The portico floor was paved with basalt, as were the dado of its walls, above which the walls were built of limestone and decorated with polychromatic relief. The reliefs portrayed rows of deities, nome and estate personifications, and fertility figures – all clutching was-sceptres and ankh signs – marching into the temple. An accompanying inscription bears their message to the king: 'We give you all life, stability, and dominion, all joy, all offerings, all perfect things that are in Upper Egypt, since you have appeared as king of Upper and Lower Egypt alive forever'. Beyond the portico, a room with two exits gives access to the transverse corridor in the north or to an oblong room preceding the cult pyramid in the south.

The cult pyramid had a core ascending in two or three steps, composed primarily of limestone block debris framed by yellow limestone blocks, and then encased with white limestone blocks – the same method of construction as used in the main pyramid. It had a base length of 15.7 m (52 ft; 30.0 cu) converging at 56° towards the apex 11.6 m (38 ft; 22.1 cu) high. From the north face, a bent corridor – initially descending, then switching to an ascent – leads into the miniature pyramid's sole chamber: an east–west oriented burial room slightly below ground level. The chamber was found void of any content, and its walls had been severely damaged by stone thieves.

The purpose of the cult pyramid remains unclear. Its burial chamber was not used for burials, but instead appears to have been a purely symbolic structure. It may have hosted the pharaoh's ka (spirit), or a miniature statue of the king. It may have been used for ritual performances centring on the burial and resurrection of the ka spirit during the Sed festival.

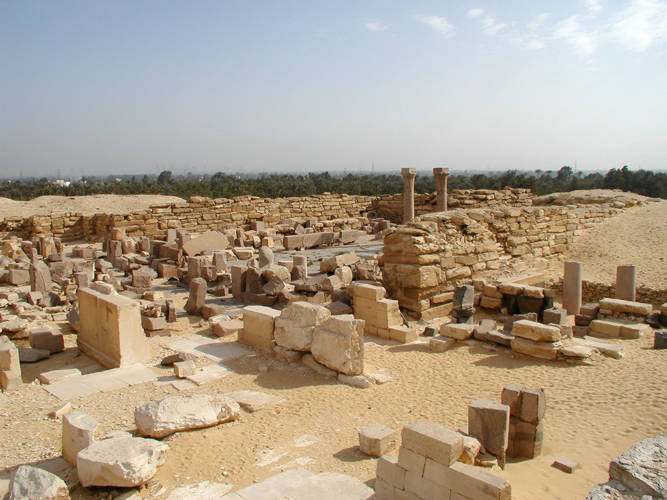
Remains of the mortuary temple; the side entrance columns to the right of image

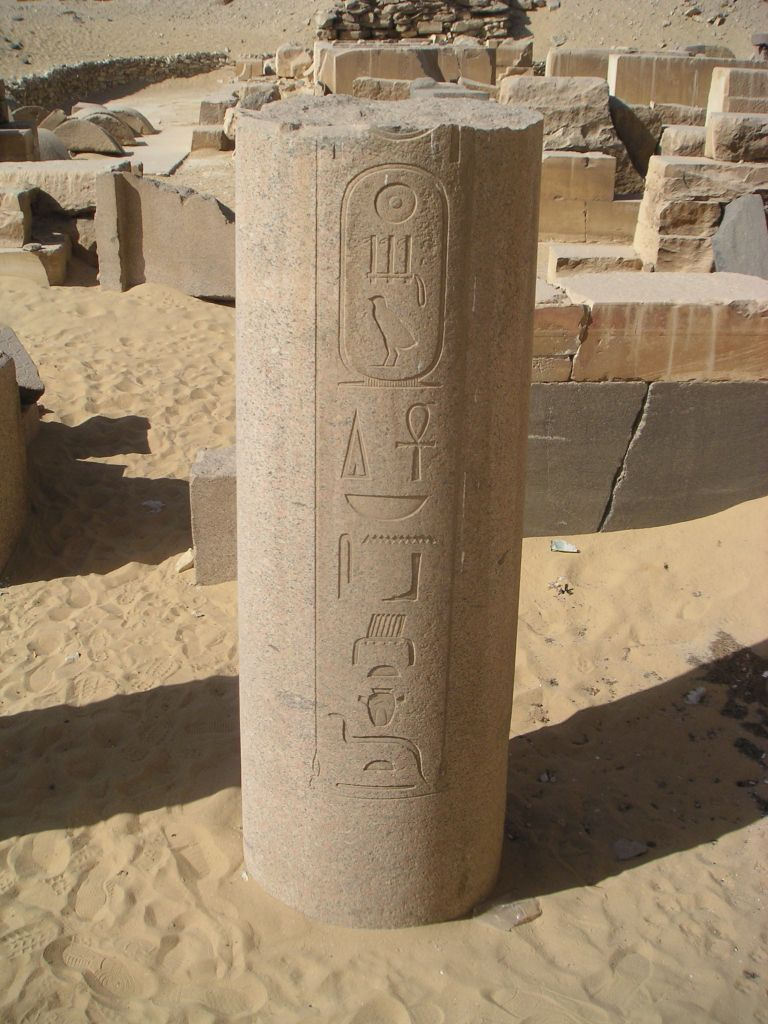
Granite column of the side entrance reading 'Sahure, given all life, health and joy for eternity'

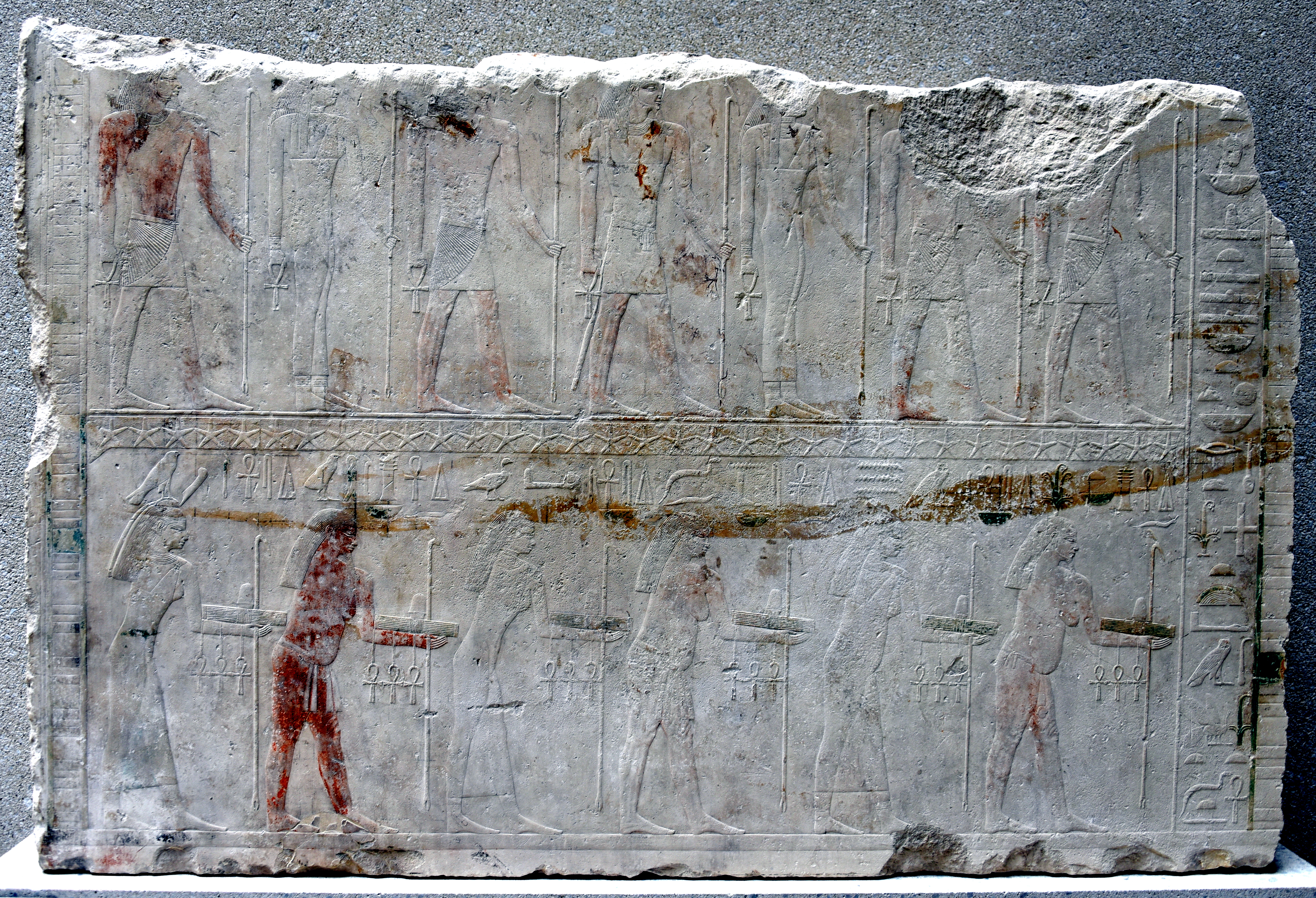
Deities, nome and estate personages, and fertility figures entering the temple

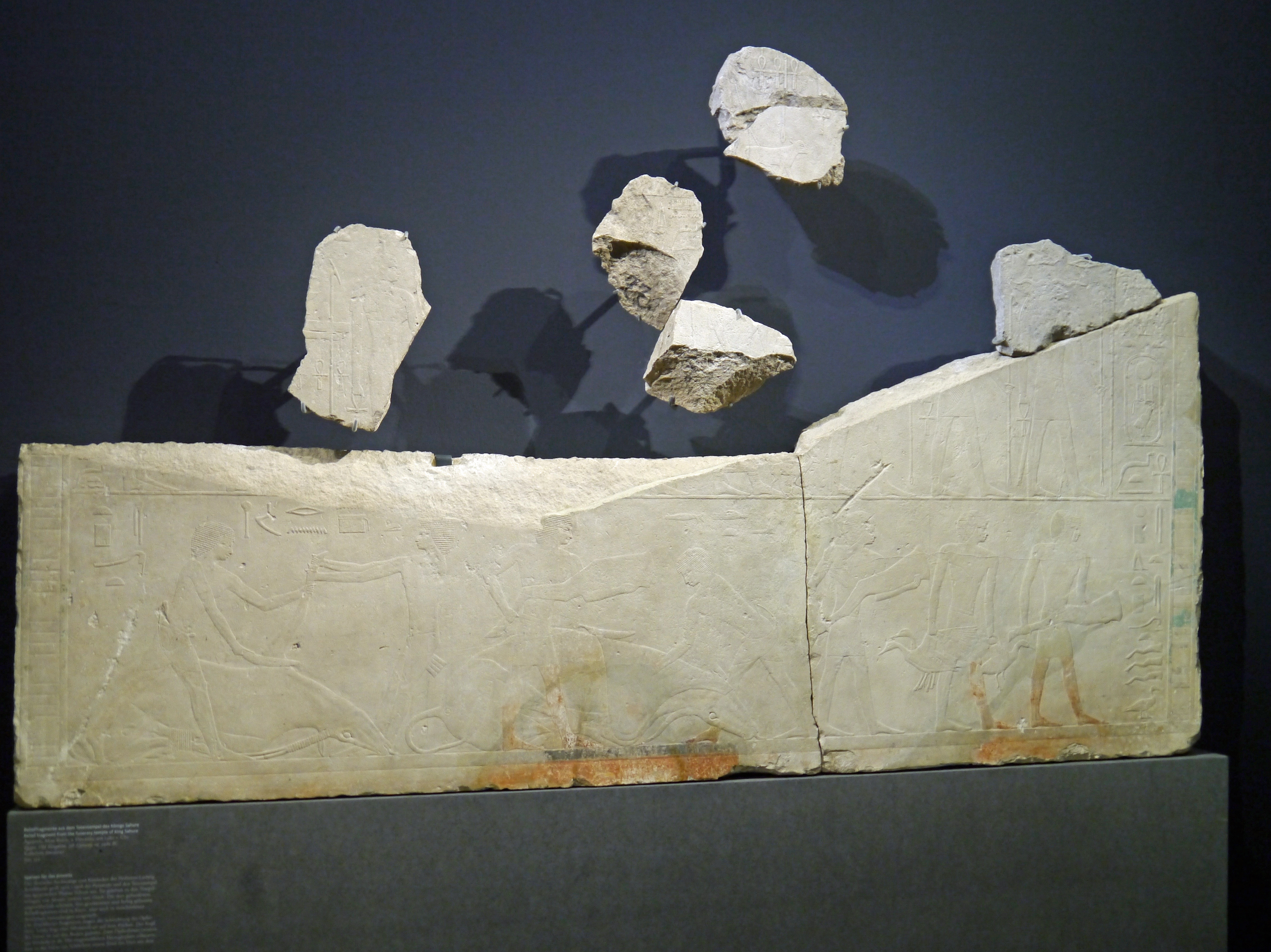
Butchers preparing and delivering offerings for the king's mortuary cult

=== Necropolis ===
There is a largely unexplored necropolis found through the side-entrance on the transverse corridor's southern end that is thought to be the burial ground of Sahure's consort, Meretnebty, and son, Netjerirenre.

== Later history ==
=== Funerary cult ===
The funerary cults at Abusir remained active through the reign of Pepi II at the end of the Sixth Dynasty, but their continuation beyond this time is a matter of dispute. Daily services, including offerings made before the false door of the offering hall and at the statues of the chapel, were held in the mortuary temple. Reliefs on the temple's side entrance walls depict processions of individuals with offerings entering into the temple, accompanied by detailed instructions for the butchers and porters. Sahure's funerary domains were also depicted on the reliefs of the causeway. Portrayed are processions of offering bearers bringing foodstuffs and leading animals into the temple. More than 200 funerary domains of Lower Egypt are shown on these blocks accounting for the most extensive record of such funerary domains yet discovered.

Priests who served Sahure's funerary cult include Tepemankh II, who also served numerous other kings from Sneferu to Userkaf; Nikare, priest of the cult of Sahure and of the sun temple of Nyuserre; Senuankh and Nenkheftka, priests of the cults of Userkaf and Sahure; Kaemnefret, priest in Sahure's pyramid and in Neferirkare's pyramid and sun temple; Kuyemsnewy and Kamesenu, priests of the cults of Sahure, Neferirkare and Nyuserre; and Khabauptah, priest of the cults of Sahure, Neferirkare, Neferefre, and Nyuserre.

=== Cult of Sekhmet ===
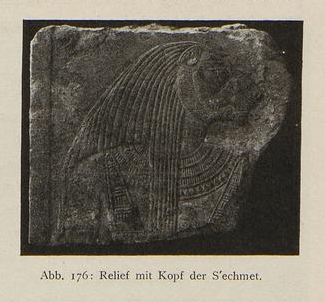
Relief fragment depicting the goddess Sekhmet

From at least the reign of Thutmose III of the Eighteenth Dynasty, the south corridor of Sahure's mortuary temple became home to a cult of Sekhmet. The cult's early history is unknown. Borchardt suggested that it originated in the Middle Kingdom, but there is no evidence to support this conjecture. The earliest attested royal connection to the cult is Thutmose IV of the Eighteenth Dynasty. Further attestations include Ay and Horemheb, Amenhotep III through a faience object with his name, and Seti I and Ramesses II through restoration inscriptions bearing their names. The renewed attention had a negative consequence as it brought on the first wave of dismantlement of the Abusir monuments, particularly for the acquisition of valuable Tura limestone. Sahure's mortuary temple may have been spared at this time due to the presence of the cult. Its influence probably waned after the end of Ramesses II's reign, becoming a site of local worship only.

The Abusir necropolis and Sahure's cult garnered attention again in the Twenty-Fifth to Twenty-Sixth Dynasties. Taharqa had various reliefs replicated – such as images of the king in the form of a sphinx crushing his enemies – from the mortuary temples of Sahure, Nyuserre, and Pepi II for the restoration of the temple of Kawa in Nubia. The cult of Sekhmet is also mentioned in a graffito found in the temple from Ahmose II's reign. In the late Twenty-Sixth to the early Twenty-Seventh Dynasty, another period of dismantlement appears to have been visited on the monuments. Sahure's was again spared, protected by the cult into the Ptolemaic Kingdom, though it had very reduced influence at this time.

A third wave of dismantlement of the Abusir monuments is attested in the Roman period by the abundant remains of mill-stones, lime production facilities, and worker shelters. At the beginning of the Christian era, Copts founded a shrine in the temple, as shown by pottery and Coptic graffiti dating to between the 4th and 7th centuries AD. Periodic farming of the monuments for limestone continued at least until the end of the 19th century.

== See also ==
- List of Egyptian pyramids

== Sources ==
- Allen, James; Allen, Susan; Anderson, Julie; et al. (1999). Egyptian Art in the Age of the Pyramids. New York: The Metropolitan Museum of Art. ISBN 978-0-8109-6543-0. OCLC 41431623.
- Altenmüller, Hartwig (2001). "Old Kingdom: Fifth Dynasty". In Redford, Donald B. (ed.). The Oxford Encyclopedia of Ancient Egypt, Volume 2. Oxford: Oxford University Press. pp. 597–601. ISBN 978-0-19-510234-5.
- Arnold, Dieter (1996). "Hypostyle Halls of the Old and Middle Kingdom?". Studies in Honor of William Kelly Simpson. Vol. 1. Boston: Museum of Fine Arts. pp. 39–54. ISBN 0-87846-390-9.
- Arnold, Dieter (1997). "Royal cult complexes of the Old and Middle Kingdoms". In Schafer, Byron E. (ed.). Temples of Ancient Egypt. Ithaca, New York: Cornell University Press. pp. 31–85. ISBN 0-8014-3399-1.
- Arnold, Dieter (2003). The Encyclopaedia of Ancient Egyptian Architecture. London: I.B. Tauris. ISBN 978-1-86064-465-8.
- Arnold, Dorothea (1999). "Royal Reliefs". Egyptian Art in the Age of the Pyramids. New York: The Metropolitan Museum of Art. pp. 83–101. ISBN 978-0-8109-6543-0. OCLC 41431623.
- Bareš, Ladislav (2000). "The destruction of the monuments at the necropolis of Abusir". In Bárta, Miroslav; Krejčí, Jaromír (eds.). Abusir and Saqqara in the Year 2000. Prague: Academy of Sciences of the Czech Republic – Oriental Institute. pp. 1–16. ISBN 80-85425-39-4.
- Bárta, Miroslav (2005). "Location of the Old Kingdom Pyramids in Egypt". Cambridge Archaeological Journal. 15 (2): 177–191. doi:10.1017/s0959774305000090. S2CID 161629772.
- Bárta, Miroslav (2015). "Abusir in the Third Millennium BC". CEGU FF. Český egyptologický ústav.
- Bárta, Miroslav (2017). "Radjedef to the Eighth Dynasty". UCLA Encyclopedia of Egyptology.
- Billing, Nils (2018). The Performative Structure: Ritualizing the Pyramid of Pepy I. Leiden & Boston: Brill. ISBN 978-90-04-37237-5.
- Borchardt, Ludwig (1910). Das Grabdenkmal des Königs S'aḥu-Re. Ausgrabungen der Deutschen Orient-Gesellschaft in Abusir 1902–1908; 6 : Wissenschaftliche Veröffentlichungen der Deutschen Orient-Gesellschaft; 14 (in German). Vol. 1. Leipzig: J.C. Hinrichs. doi:10.11588/DIGLIT.3365. OCLC 406055066.
- Borchardt, Ludwig (1913a). Das Grabdenkmal des Königs S'aḥu-Re. Ausgrabungen der Deutschen Orient-Gesellschaft in Abusir 1902–1908; 7 : Wissenschaftliche Veröffentlichungen der Deutschen Orient-Gesellschaft; 26 (in German). Vol. 2. Leipzig: J.C. Hinrichs. doi:10.11588/diglit.3367.
- Borchardt, Ludwig (1913b). Das Grabdenkmal des Königs S'aḥu-Re. Ausgrabungen der Deutschen Orient-Gesellschaft in Abusir 1902–1908; 7 : Wissenschaftliche Veröffentlichungen der Deutschen Orient-Gesellschaft; 26 (in German). Vol. 2. Leipzig: J.C. Hinrichs. doi:10.11588/diglit.3366.
- Clayton, Peter A. (1994). Chronicle of the Pharaohs. London: Thames & Hudson. ISBN 978-0-500-05074-3.
- Dodson, Aidan; Hilton, Dyan (2004). The Complete Royal Families of Ancient Egypt. London: Thames & Hudson. ISBN 0-500-05128-3.
- Dodson, Aidan (2015). Monarchs of the Nile: New Revised Edition. Cairo: American University in Cairo Press. ISBN 978-977-416-716-4.
- Edwards, Iorwerth (1975). The Pyramids of Egypt. Baltimore: Harmondsworth. ISBN 978-0-14-020168-0.
- Edwards, Iorwerth (1999). "Abusir". In Bard, Kathryn (ed.). Encyclopedia of the Archaeology of Ancient Egypt. London; New York: Routledge. pp. 97–99. ISBN 978-0-203-98283-9.
- Ernst, Herbert (2001). "Der Kult in den Opferhöfen der Totentempel des Alten und Mittleren Reiches". Studien zur Altägyptischen Kultur (in German). 29. Hamburg: Helmut Buske Verlag GmBH: 41–53. JSTOR 25152836.
- Espinel, Andrés Diego (2017). "Chapter 3: The scents of Punt (and elsewhere): trade and functions of snṯr and ˁntw during the Old Kingdom". In Incordino, Ilaria; Creasman, Pearce Paul (eds.). Flora Trade Between Egypt and Africa in Antiquity. Oxford: Oxbow Books. ISBN 978-1-78570-639-4.
- Gaber, Amr Aly Aly (2003). "Aspects of the deification of some Old Kingdom kings". In Eyma, Aayko K.; Bennett, C. J. (eds.). A Delta-man in Yebu. Occasional volume of the Egyptologists' Electronic Forum. Vol. 1. Boca Raton, FL: Universal Publishers. ISBN 978-1-58112-564-1.
- Goelet, Ogden (1999). "Abu Ghurab/Abusir after the 5th Dynasty". In Bard, Kathryn (ed.). Encyclopedia of the Archaeology of Ancient Egypt. London; New York: Routledge. p. 87. ISBN 978-0-203-98283-9.
- Grimal, Nicolas (1992). A History of Ancient Egypt. Translated by Ian Shaw. Oxford: Blackwell Publishing. ISBN 978-0-631-19396-8.
- Hayes, William C. (1990) [1953]. The Scepter of Egypt: A Background for the Study of the Egyptian Antiquities in The Metropolitan Museum of Art. Vol. 1, From the Earliest Times to the End of the Middle Kingdom. New York: Metropolitan Museum of Art. OCLC 233920917.
- Hellum, Jennifer (2007). The Pyramids. Westport, CT: Greenwood Press. ISBN 978-0-313-32580-9.
- Kahl, Jochem (2000). "Die Rolle von Saqqara und Abusir bei der Überlieferung altägyptischer Jenseitsbücher". In Bárta, Miroslav; Krejčí, Jaromír (eds.). Abusir and Saqqara in the Year 2000 (in German). Prague: Academy of Sciences of the Czech Republic – Oriental Institute. pp. 215–228. ISBN 80-85425-39-4.
- Khaled, Mohamed Ismail (2013). "The Economic Aspects of the Old Kingdom Royal Funerary Domains". Études et Travaux (XXVI). Warsaw: Instytut Kultur Śródziemnomorskich i Orientalnych Polskiej Akademii Nauk: 364–372. ISSN 2084-6762.
- Khaled, Mohamed Ismail (2020). "The Pyramid Complex of King Sahura – Protection, Restoration and Documentation". American Research Centre in Egypt.
- Khaled, Mohamed Ismail (2023). "Newly discovered magazines in the pyramid of Sahura at Abusir: preliminary report". Journal of the American Research Center in Egypt (59): 127–144. doi:10.5913/jarce.59.2023.a006. ISSN 0065-9991.
- Lehner, Mark (1999). "Pyramids (Old Kingdom), construction of". In Bard, Kathryn (ed.). Encyclopedia of the Archaeology of Ancient Egypt. London; New York: Routledge. pp. 778–786. ISBN 978-0-203-98283-9.
- Lehner, Mark (2008). The Complete Pyramids. New York: Thames & Hudson. ISBN 978-0-500-28547-3.
- Málek, Jaromír (2003). "The Old Kingdom (c. 2686–2160 BC)". In Shaw, Ian (ed.). The Oxford History of Ancient Egypt. Oxford: Oxford University Press. pp. 83–107. ISBN 978-0-19-815034-3.
- Mariette, Auguste (1889). Maspero, Gaston (ed.). Les Mastabas de l'Ancien Empire: fragment du dernier ouvrage de Auguste Édouard Mariette. Paris: F. Vieweg. OCLC 10266163.
- Megahed, Mohamed (2016). "The antichambre carrée in the Old Kingdom. Decoration and function". In Landgráfová, Renata; Mynářová, Jana (eds.). Rich and great: studies in honour of Anthony J. Spalinger on the occasion of his 70th Feast of Thoth. Prague: Charles University in Prague, Faculty of Arts. pp. 239–259. ISBN 978-80-7308-668-8.
- Morales, Antonio J. (2006). "Traces of official and popular veneration to Nyuserra Iny at Abusir. Late Fifth Dynasty to the Middle Kingdom". In Bárta, Miroslav; Coppens, Filip; Krejčí, Jaromír (eds.). Abusir and Saqqara in the Year 2005, Proceedings of the Conference held in Prague (June 27 – July 5, 2005). Prague: Academy of Sciences of the Czech Republic, Oriental Institute. pp. 311–341. ISBN 978-80-7308-116-4.
- Peck, William H. (2001). "Lepsius, Karl Richard". In Redford, Donald B. (ed.). The Oxford Encyclopedia of Ancient Egypt, Volume 2. Oxford: Oxford University Press. pp. 289–290. ISBN 978-0-19-510234-5.
- Ramsey, Christopher Bronk; Dee, Michael W.; Rowland, Joanne M.; et al. (2010). "Radiocarbon-Based Chronology for Dynastic Egypt". Science. Vol. 328, no. 5985. Washington, DC: American Association for the Advancement of Science. pp. 1554–1557. JSTOR 40656429.
- Sampsell, Bonnie (2000). "Pyramid Design and Construction – Part I: The Accretion Theory". The Ostracon. 11 (3). Denver.
- Scott, Nora E. (1952). "Two Statue Groups of the V Dynasty". The Metropolitan Museum of Art Bulletin. 11 (4). New York: Metropolitan Museum of Art: 116–122. doi:10.2307/3257554. ISSN 0026-1521. JSTOR 3257554.
- Sethe, Kurt (1933). Urkunden des Alten Reiches [Documents of the Ancient Empires] (PDF) (in German). Vol. 1. Leipzig: J. C. Hinrichs'sche Buchhandlung. OCLC 883262096.
- Shaw, Ian, ed. (2003). The Oxford History of Ancient Egypt. Oxford: Oxford University Press. ISBN 978-0-19-815034-3.
- Stadelmann, Rainer (1985). Die Ägyptischen Pyramiden: vom Ziegelbau zum Weltwunder. Kulturgeschichte der antiken Welt, 30 (in German). Mainz: von Zabern. ISBN 978-3-8053-0855-7.
- Strudwick, Nigel (2005). Leprohon, Ronald J. (ed.). Texts from the Pyramid Age. Atlanta: Society of Biblical Literature. ISBN 978-1-58983-183-4.
- Verner, Miroslav (1994). Forgotten Pharaohs, Lost Pyramids: Abusir (PDF). Prague: Academia Škodaexport. ISBN 978-80-200-0022-4. Archived from the original (PDF) on 2011-02-01.
- Verner, Miroslav (2001a). "Abusir". In Redford, Donald B. (ed.). The Oxford Encyclopedia of Ancient Egypt, Volume 1. Oxford: Oxford University Press. pp. 5–7. ISBN 978-0-19-510234-5.
- Verner, Miroslav (2001b). "Old Kingdom". In Redford, Donald B. (ed.). The Oxford Encyclopedia of Ancient Egypt, Volume 2. Oxford: Oxford University Press. pp. 585–591. ISBN 978-0-19-510234-5.
- Verner, Miroslav (2001c). "Pyramid". In Redford, Donald B. (ed.). The Oxford Encyclopedia of Ancient Egypt, Volume 3. Oxford: Oxford University Press. pp. 87–95. ISBN 978-0-19-510234-5.
- Verner, Miroslav (2001d). The Pyramids: The Mystery, Culture and Science of Egypt's Great Monuments. New York: Grove Press. ISBN 978-0-8021-1703-8.
- Verner, Miroslav (2002). Abusir: Realm of Osiris. Cairo; New York: American Univ in Cairo Press. ISBN 978-977-424-723-1.
- Verner, Miroslav (2007). "New Archaeological Discoveries in the Abusir Pyramid Field". Archaeogate: Egittologia (in Italian and English). Archived from the original on 2009-04-27.
- Verner, Miroslav (2015). "The miraculous rise of the Fifth Dynasty – The story of Papyrus Westcar and historical evidence". Prague Egyptological Studies (XV): 86–92. ISSN 1214-3189.
- von Beckerath, Jürgen (1984). Handbuch der ägyptischen Königsnamen. München: Deutscher Kunstverlag. ISBN 978-3-422-00832-8.
- Wachsmann, Shelley (2018). Seagoing Ships and Seamanship in the Bronze Age Levant. College Station: Texas A & M University Press. ISBN 978-1-60344-080-6.
- Wilkinson, Richard H. (2000). The Complete Temples of Ancient Egypt. New York: Thames & Hudson. ISBN 978-0-500-05100-9.
