= Oxford Encyclopedia of Ancient Egypt =

The Oxford Encyclopedia of Ancient Egypt, edited by Donald B. Redford and published in three volumes by Oxford University Press in 2001, contains 600 articles that cover the 4,000 years of the history of Ancient Egypt, from the predynastic era to the seventh century CE. Articles cover art, architecture, religion, language, literature, politics, trade, everyday social life, and court culture in the Nile Valley.

== Awards ==
- 2001 Choice Outstanding Academic Title
- 2001 Library Journal Best Reference
- 2002 American Library Association (ALA)/RUSA Dartmouth Medal Outstanding Reference Source
- 2002 Association of American Publishers Best Multivolume Reference, Humanities
