= Donald B. Redford =

Canadian Egyptologist (1934–2024)

Donald Bruce Redford (2 September 1934 – 18 October 2024) was a Canadian Egyptologist, archaeologist, and Professor of Classics and Ancient Mediterranean Studies at Pennsylvania State University; he retired in 2024. Redford directed a number of important excavations in Egypt, notably at Karnak and Mendes.

== Biography ==
Redford received his BA, MA, and PhD from McGill University and the University of Toronto, and was an Assistant/Associate Professor (1962–1969) and full Professor (1969–1998) at the latter. He moved to Pennsylvania State University in 1998, where he retired in July 2024.

He was trained in semitics by Wilfred Lambert, James Wilson, and Abraham Sachs. He learned the Egyptian language under the professors Richard Parker, Hans Polotsky, and Ricardo Caminos. From 1964 to 1967 he participated in the Old Jerusalem excavations led by Kathleen Kenyon.

Redford was the winner of the 1993 "Best Scholarly Book in Archaeology" awarded by the Biblical Archaeology Society for his work Egypt, Canaan, and Israel in Ancient Times. In the book he argues that the experiences of the Hyksos in Egypt became a central foundation of myths in Canaanite culture, leading to the story of Moses. He further argues that almost all the toponymic details in the Exodus story reflect conditions in Egypt not earlier than the Twenty-sixth Dynasty, the Saite period, namely the 7th century BC. Whoever, Redford argues, provided the author of Exodus with these details had no access to Egyptian material earlier than that date. This view was expounded upon in The Bible Unearthed by Israel Finkelstein and Neil Silberman.

Redford's work in editing The Oxford Encyclopedia of Ancient Egypt, published in 2001, earned the American Library Association's Dartmouth Medal for a reference work of outstanding quality and significance. Since 2006 he was also in the editorial board of RIHAO.

His work in uncovering the foundation of one of Akhenaten's temples was the subject of a one-hour 1980 National Film Board of Canada documentary, The Lost Pharaoh: The Search for Akhenaten.

Redford was married to Susan Redford, also an Egyptologist. Donald B. Redford died at his home in State College, Pennsylvania on 18 October 2024, at the age of 90.

== Akhenaten Temple Project ==
The Akhenaten Temple Project is a project encompassing four archaeological expeditions to Egypt and north-east Africa. It has been in operation since 1972. The project was directed by Donald and Susan Redford and is part of Pennsylvania State University.

It has excavated at Mendes (in the Nile Delta), Karnak, Tel Kedwa (in North Sinai) and in the Theban necropolis (mainly investigating the tomb of Parennefer).

Along with his wife Susan Redford, he was the director of the Akhenaten Temple Project.

== Publications ==
- History and Chronology of the Eighteenth Dynasty of Egypt: Seven Studies. Toronto University Press, 1967.
- A Study of the Biblical Story of Joseph (Gen 37-50). Leiden: Brill, 1970.
- Akhenaten: the Heretic King. Princeton University Press, 1984. ISBN 0-691-03567-9
- Pharaonic King-Lists, Annals, and Day-Books: a Contribution to the Study of the Egyptian Sense of History. (SSEA Publication IV) Mississauga, Ontario: Benben Publications, 1986. ISBN 0-920168-08-6 SCRIBD
- Egypt, Canaan, and Israel in Ancient Times. Princeton University Press, 1992. ISBN 0-691-00086-7
- The Oxford Encyclopedia of Ancient Egypt (editor). Oxford University Press, 2001. ISBN 0-19-510234-7
- The Wars in Syria and Palestine of Thutmose III. (Culture and History of the Ancient Near East 16) Leiden: Brill, 2003. ISBN 90-04-12989-8
- Slave to Pharaoh: the Black Experience of Ancient Egypt. Johns Hopkins University Press, 2004. ISBN 0-8018-7814-4
- City of the Ram-Man: the Story of Ancient Mendes. Princeton University Press, 2010. ISBN 978-0-691-14226-5
- The Oxford Guide: Essential Guide to Egyptian Mythology (editor), Berkley, 2003, ISBN 0-425-19096-X
