= Userkaf =

Ancient Egyptian pharaoh

- Ouserkaf, Weserkaf, Woserkaf, Usercherês, Οὐσερχέρης
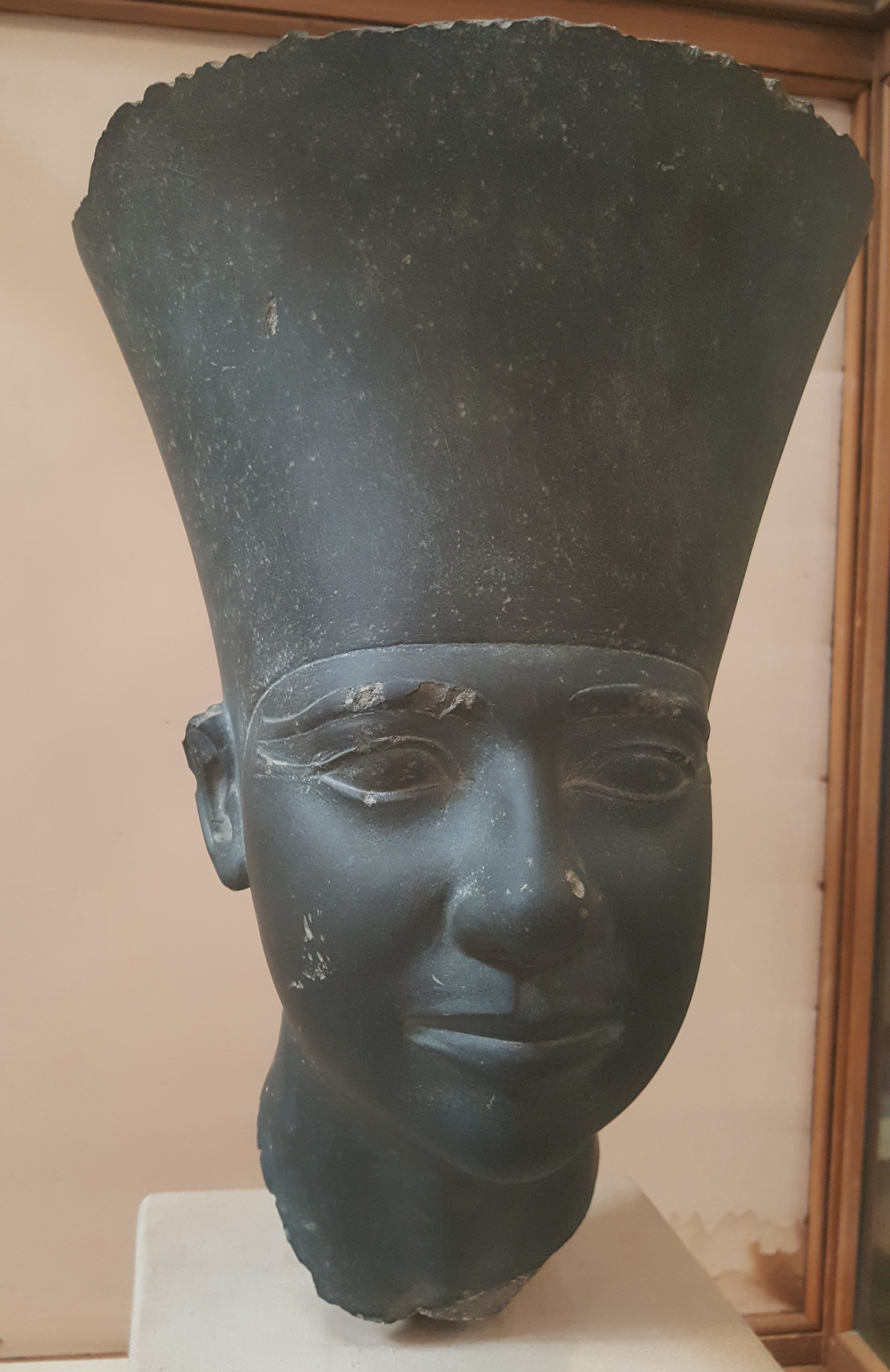
- Head of Userkaf, recovered from his sun temple

Pharaoh
- Reign: 7 regnal years late 26th to early 25th century BC. (Note: Proposed dates for Userkaf's reign: 2560–2553 BC, 2513–2506 BC, 2504–2496 BC, 2498–2491 BC, 2494–2487 BC 2479–2471 BC, 2466–2458 BC 2465–2458 BC, 2454–2447 BC, 2454–2446 BC, 2435–2429 BC, 2392–2385 BC)
- Predecessor: Shepseskaf (most likely) or Thamphthis (possibly known as Djedefptah)
- Successor: Sahure
Royal titulary
Horus name
Hor Irymaat
Hr-iry-maat
Horus, he who ensures the harmony
Alternative translations:
Performer of Maat
He who puts Maat into practice
The one who has accomplished Maat
G5	D4 U1 Aa11 t
Nebty name
Irymaat
nbtj iry-maat
He who ensures the harmony
Alternative translations:
Performer of Maat
He who puts Maat into practice
The one who has accomplished Maat
G16	D4 U1 Aa11 t
Golden Horus
Bik Nebu Nefer
bik-nbw-nfr
The perfect golden falcon
F35 G7 S12
Prenomen
Userkaf
wsr-k3-f
His Ka is strong
Alternative translations:
Powerful is his Ka
His Ka is potent
M23 t L2 t < S29 F12 D28 I9 >
Nomen
Userkaf
wsr-k3-f
His Ka is strong
Alternative translations:
Powerful is his Ka
His Ka is potent

G39 N5	G43 S29 F12 D28 I9
- Consort: Neferhetepes (most likely) or Khentkaus I
- Children: Sahure ♂, Khamaat ♀
- Father: unknown, but probably belonged to a branch of the Fourth Dynasty royal family
- Mother: Khentkaus I? Raddjedet (myth)
- Monuments: Pyramid Wab-Isut-Userkaf; Pyramid of Neferhetepes; Sun temple Nekhenre; Temple of Montu in El-Tod
- Dynasty: Fifth Dynasty

Userkaf (known in Ancient Greek as Οὐσερχέρης, Usercherês) was a pharaoh of ancient Egypt and the founder of the Fifth Dynasty. He reigned for six to seven years in the early 25th century BC, during the Old Kingdom period. He probably belonged to a branch of the Fourth Dynasty royal family, although his parentage is uncertain; he could have been the son of Khentkaus I. He had at least one daughter and very probably had a son, Sahure, with his consort Neferhetepes. This son succeeded him as pharaoh.

His reign heralded the ascendancy of the cult of Ra, who effectively became Egypt's state god during the Fifth Dynasty. Userkaf may have been a high-priest of Ra before ascending the throne, and built a sun temple, known as the Nekhenre, between Abusir and Abu Gurab. In doing so, he instituted a tradition followed by his successors over a period of 80 years. The Nekhenre mainly functioned as a mortuary temple for the setting sun. Rites performed in the temple were primarily concerned with Ra's creator function and his role as father of the king. Taken with the reduction in the size of the royal mortuary complex, this suggests a more concrete separation between the sun god and the king than in the preceding dynasties. After Userkaf's death, his temple was the subject of four building phases, during which it acquired a large obelisk.

Userkaf built a pyramid in Saqqara close to that of Djoser, a location that forced architects to put the associated mortuary temple in an unusual position, to the south of the pyramid. The latter was much smaller than those built during the Fourth Dynasty but the mortuary complex was lavishly and extensively decorated with fine painted reliefs. In addition to his own pyramid and temple, Userkaf built a smaller pyramid close to his for one of his queens, likely Neferhetepes. Although Userkaf was the object of a funerary cult after his death like the other Fifth Dynasty kings, his was relatively unimportant, and was abandoned after the end of the dynasty. Little is known of his activities beyond the construction of his pyramid and sun temple. The Old Kingdom royal annals record offerings of beer, bread and lands to various gods, some of which may correspond to building projects on Userkaf's behalf, including the temple of Montu in El-Tod where he is the earliest attested pharaoh. Beyond the borders of Egypt, a military expedition to Canaan or the Eastern Desert may have taken place, and trade contacts with the Aegean seem to have existed at the time.

== Family ==
=== Parents and consort ===
The identity of Userkaf's parents is uncertain, but he undoubtedly had family connections with the rulers of the preceding Fourth Dynasty. Egyptologist Miroslav Verner proposes that he was a son of Menkaure by one of his secondary queens (Note: The historians Rosalie and Anthony David concur, stating that Userkaf belonged to a side branch of Khafra's family.) and possibly a full brother to his predecessor and the last king of the Fourth Dynasty, Shepseskaf.

Alternatively, Nicolas Grimal, Peter Clayton and Michael Rice propose that Userkaf was the son of a Neferhetepes, whom Grimal, Giovanna Magi and Rice see as a daughter of Djedefre and Hetepheres II. The identity of Neferhetepes's husband in this hypothesis is unknown, but Grimal conjectures that he may have been the "priest of Ra, lord of Sakhebu", mentioned in Westcar papyrus. (Note: This papyrus, now recognised as non-historical, records a story according to which Userkaf is a son of the god Ra with a woman named Rededjet. In the story, two of Userkaf's brothers are said to rise to the throne after him, displacing Khufu's family from the throne.) Aidan Dodson and Dyan Hilton propose that Neferhetepes was buried in the pyramid next to that of Userkaf, (Note: This queen is referred to as Neferhetepes Q in modern Egyptology to distinguish her from preceding women of the same name.) which is believed to have belonged to a woman of the same name. (Note: The attribution of the pyramid to a queen named Neferhetepes is not certain and relies on indirect evidence in the form of an inscription mentioning the queen in the nearby tomb of Persen, a priest of her funerary cult.)

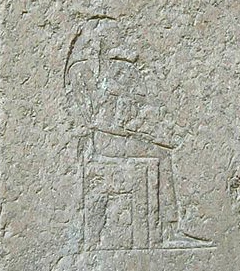
Portrait of Khentkaus I from her tomb

The location of the pyramid attributed to Neferhetepes, however, strongly suggests that she may instead have been Userkaf's wife. If so she should be identified with the Neferhetepes who is the mother of Userkaf's successor and likely son, Sahure. A relief from Sahure's causeway depicts this king and his queen together with the king's mother, identified as a Neferhetepes, which very likely makes her Userkaf's wife. Like Grimal, Jaromír Malek sees her as a daughter of Djedefre and Hetepheres II. Following this hypothesis, Mark Lehner also suggests that Userkaf's mother may have been Khentkaus I, an idea shared by Arielle P. Kozloff.

Dodson and Hilton argue that Neferhetepes is not given the title of king's wife in later documents pertaining to her mortuary cult, although they note that this absence is inconclusive. They propose that Userkaf's queen may have been Khentkaus I, a hypothesis shared by Selim Hassan. Clayton and Rosalie and Anthony David concur, further positing that Khentkaus I was Menkaure's daughter. Bernhard Grdseloff argues that Userkaf, as a descendant of pharaoh Djedefre marrying a woman from the main royal line—that of Khafre and Menkaure—could have unified two rival factions within the royal family and ended possible dynastic struggles. Alternatively, Userkaf could have been the high priest of Ra before ascending the throne, giving him sufficient influence to marry Shepseskaf's widow in the person of Khentkaus I. (Note: Ludwig Borchardt expanded on the theory according to which Khentkaus I was Userkaf's spouse by positing that Userkaf managed to take the throne at the unexpected death of Shepseskaf and before the legitimate heirs Sahure and Neferirkare were old enough to rule. This hypothesis has been conclusively invalidated by recent research which established: 1) that there were two queens named Khentkaus, the first being possibly Userkaf's mother while the second was the mother of Nyuserre Ini; 2) that Sahure is Userkaf's son; and 3) that Neferirkare was the son of Sahure.)

=== Children ===
Many Egyptologists, including Verner, Zemina, David, and Baker, believe that Sahure was Userkaf's son rather than his brother as suggested by the Westcar papyrus. The main evidence is a relief showing Sahure and his mother Neferhetepes, this being also the name of the queen who is believed to have owned the pyramid next to Userkaf's. An additional argument supporting the filiation of Sahure is the location of his pyramid in close proximity to Userkaf's sun temple. No other child of Userkaf has been identified except a daughter named Khamaat, mentioned in inscriptions uncovered in the mastaba of Ptahshepses.

== Reign ==
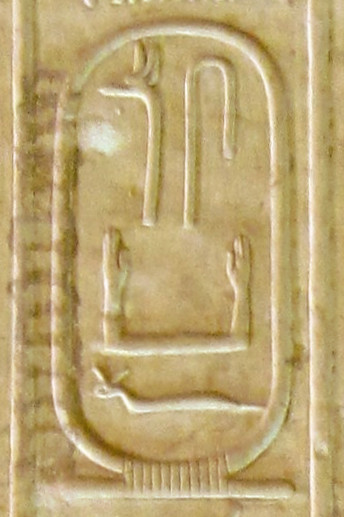
Cartouche of Userkaf on the Abydos king list

=== Duration ===
The exact duration of Userkaf's reign is unknown. Given the historical and archeological evidence, the consensus among Egyptologists is that he ruled for seven to eight years at the start of Egypt's Fifth Dynasty. First, an analysis of the nearly contemporaneous Old Kingdom royal annals shows that Userkaf's reign was recorded on eight compartments corresponding to at least seven full years but not much more. (Note: Older analyses of the document by Breasted and Daressy had already established that Userkaf reigned 12 to 14 years or 12 to 13 years respectively.) The latest legible year recorded on the annals for Userkaf is that of his third cattle count, to evaluate the amount of taxes to be levied on the population. This significant event is believed to have been biennial during the Old Kingdom period, meaning that the third cattle count represents the sixth year of his reign. The same count is also attested in a mason's inscription found on a stone of Userkaf's sun temple. (Note: Four mentions of the "year of the fifth cattle count" were also discovered on stone tablets from Userkaf's sun temple, which could indicate that Userkaf reigned for 10 years. However, these inscriptions are incomplete. In particular the name of the king to whose reign they belong is lost, and they might instead refer to Sahure's rule or to Neferirkare's rather than that of Userkaf. The attribution of these inscriptions to either Sahure or Neferirkare is paramount in determining who completed Userkaf's sun temple, which was unfinished at his death. The tablets detail the division of labour during works on the Nekhenre.) Second, Userkaf is given a reign of seven years on the third column, row 17, of the Turin Royal Canon, a document copied during the reign of Ramesses II from earlier sources. Third, very few small artefacts bearing Userkaf's name have been found, witnessing a short reign. These include a gold mounted diorite jar, a five-deben stone weight and a stone cylinder seal from Elephantine, now all in the Metropolitan Museum of Art, as well as an ivory cylinder seal in the British Museum and yet another seal in the Bulaq Museum.

The only historical source favouring a longer reign is the Aegyptiaca (Αἰγυπτιακά), a history of Egypt written in the 3rd century BC, during the reign of Ptolemy II (283–246 BC) by Manetho. No copies of the Aegyptiaca have survived and it is now known only through later writings by Sextus Julius Africanus and Eusebius. According to the Byzantine scholar George Syncellus, Africanus wrote that the Aegyptiaca mentioned the succession "Usercherês → Sephrês → Nefercherês" at the start of the Fifth Dynasty. Usercherês, Sephrês, and Nefercherês are believed to be the Hellenized forms for Userkaf, Sahure and Neferirkare, respectively. In particular, Manetho's reconstruction of the early Fifth Dynasty is in agreement with those given on the Abydos king list and the Saqqara Tablet, two lists of kings written during the reigns of Seti I and Ramesses II, respectively. In contrast with the Turin canon, Africanus's report of the Aegyptiaca estimates that Userkaf reigned for 28 years, much longer than the modern consensus.

=== Founder of the Fifth Dynasty ===
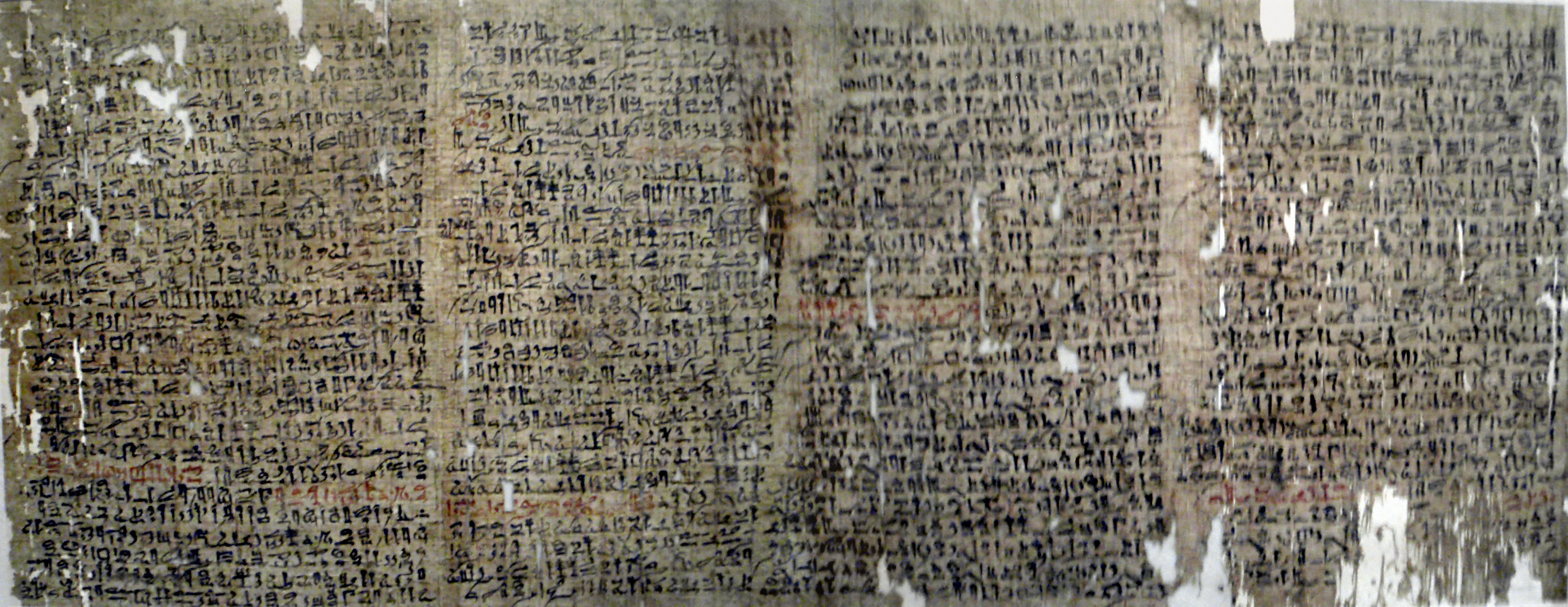
The Westcar papyrus, on display in the Ägyptisches Museum, dates to the 17th Dynasty but its story was possibly first written during the 12th Dynasty.

The division of ancient Egyptian kings into dynasties is an invention of Manetho's Aegyptiaca, intended to adhere more closely to the expectations of Manetho's patrons, the Greek rulers of Ptolemaic Egypt. A distinction between the Fourth and Fifth dynasties may nonetheless have been recognised by the ancient Egyptians, as recorded by a much older tradition found in the tale of the Westcar papyrus. In this story, King Khufu of the Fourth Dynasty is foretold the demise of his line and the rise of a new dynasty through the accession of three brothers, sons of Ra, to the throne of Egypt. This tale dates to the Seventeenth or possibly the Twelfth Dynasty.

Beyond such historical evidence, the division between the Fourth and Fifth Dynasties seems to reflect actual changes taking place at the time, in particular in Egyptian religion, and in the king's role. Ra's primacy over the rest of the Egyptian pantheon and the increased royal devotion given to him made Ra a sort of state-god, a novelty in comparison with the Fourth Dynasty, when more emphasis was put on royal burials.

Userkaf's position before ascending to the throne is unknown. Grimal states that he could have been a high-priest of Ra in Heliopolis or Sakhebu, a cult-center of Ra mentioned in the Westcar papyrus. The hypothesis of a connection between the origins of the Fifth Dynasty and Sakhebu was first proposed by the Egyptologist Flinders Petrie, who noted that in Egyptian hieroglyphs the name of Sakhebu resembles that of Elephantine, the city that Manetho gives as the cradle of the Fifth Dynasty. According to Petrie, positing that the Westcar papyrus records a tradition that remembered the origins of the Fifth Dynasty could explain Manetho's records, especially given that there is otherwise no particular connection between Elephantine and Fifth Dynasty pharaohs.

=== Activities in Egypt ===
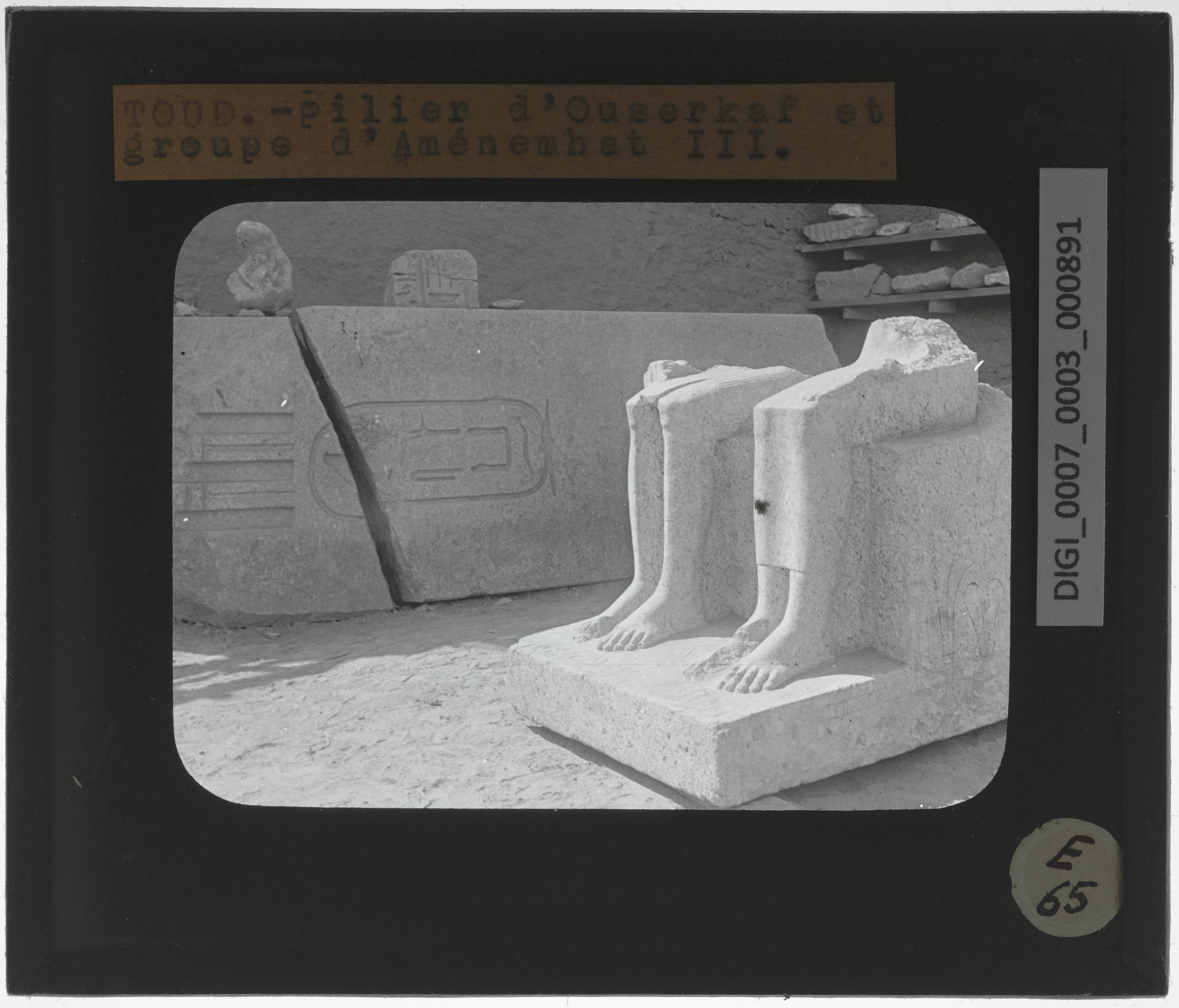
In the background, column bearing Userkaf's cartouche found at the temple of Montu, El-Tod

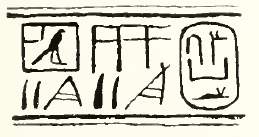
Cylinder seal of Userkaf reading "Userkaf beloved of the gods, beloved of Hathor" (Note: The seal was in the British Museum at the end of the 19th century, its current location is unknown.)

Beyond the constructions of his mortuary complex and sun temple, little is known of Userkaf. Malek says his short reign may indicate that he was elderly upon becoming pharaoh. Verner sees Userkaf's reign as significant in that it marks the apex of the sun cult, (Note: Egyptologists including Jürgen von Beckerath rather consider Nyuserre's reign as the peak of the solar cult, but for Grimal this is exaggerated.) the pharaonic title of "Son of Ra" becoming systematic from his reign onwards.

In Upper Egypt, Userkaf either commissioned or enlarged the temple of Montu at Tod, where he is the earliest attested pharaoh. Due to structural alterations, in particular during the early Middle Kingdom, New Kingdom and Ptolemaic periods, little of Userkaf's original temple has survived. It was a small mud-brick chapel including a granite pillar, inscribed with the name of the king.

Further domestic activities may be inferred from the annals of the Old Kingdom, written during Neferirkare's or Nyuserre's reign. (Note: The surviving fragments of the annal likely date to the much later 25th Dynasty (fl. 760–656 BCE), but were certainly copied or compiled from Old Kingdom sources.) They record that Userkaf gave endowments for the gods of Heliopolis (Note: More precisely to the "Bas of Heliopolis".) in the second and sixth years (Note: That is, if cattle counts were indeed biennial. The annals state only that the donations happened in the years of the first and third cattle counts.) of his reign as well as to the gods of Buto in his sixth year, both of which may have been destined for building projects on Userkaf's behalf. In the same vein, the annals record a donation of land to Horus during Userkaf's sixth year on the throne, this time explicitly mentioning "building [Horus'] temple".

Other gods honoured by Userkaf include Ra and Hathor, both of whom received land donations recorded in the annals, as well as Nekhbet, Wadjet, the "gods of the divine palace of Upper Egypt" and the "gods of the estate Djebaty" who received bread, beer and land. Finally, a fragmentary piece of text in the annals suggests that Min might also have benefited from Userkaf's donations. Further evidence for religious activities taking place at the time is given by a royal decree found in the mastaba of the administration official Nykaankh buried at Tihna al-Jabal in Middle Egypt. By this decree, Userkaf donates and reforms several royal domains for the maintenance of the cult of Hathor and installs Nykaankh as priest of this cult.

Excavations of the pyramid temple of Amenemhat I at Lisht produced a block decorated with a relief bearing the titulary of Userkaf. The block had been reused as a building material. The relief mentions a journey of the king to the temple of Bastet in a ship called "He who controls the subjects [...]".

While Userkaf chose Saqqara to build his pyramid complex, officials at the time, including the vizier Seshathotep Heti, continued to build their tombs in the Giza necropolis.

=== Trade and military activities ===
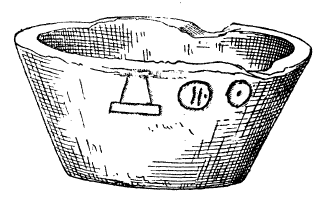
Stone vessel from Kythira bearing the name of Userkaf's sun temple

Userkaf's reign might have witnessed the birth of direct trade between Egypt and its Aegean neighbors as shown by a series of reliefs from his mortuary temple representing ships engaged in what may be a naval expedition. Further evidence for such contacts is a stone vessel bearing the name of his sun temple that was uncovered on the Greek island of Kythira. This vase is the earliest evidence of commercial contacts between Egypt and the Aegean world. Finds in Anatolia, dating to the reigns of Menkauhor Kaiu and Djedkare Isesi, demonstrate that these contacts continued throughout the Fifth Dynasty.

South of Egypt, Userkaf launched a military expedition into Nubia, while the Old Kingdom annals record that he received tribute from a region that is either the Eastern Desert or Canaan in the form of a workforce of one chieftain and 70 foreigners (likely women), as well as 303 "pacified rebels" destined to work on Userkaf's pyramid. These might have been prisoners from another military expedition to the east of Egypt or rebels exiled from Egypt prior to Userkaf's second year on the throne and now willing to reintegrate into Egyptian society. According to the Egyptologist Hartwig Altenmüller these people might have been punished following dynastic struggles connected with the end of the Fourth Dynasty. Finally, some reliefs from Userkaf's mortuary temple depict a successful military venture against Asiatic Bedouins, whom Userkaf is shown smiting, as well as a naval expedition.

=== Statuary ===
Several fragmentary statues of Userkaf have been uncovered. These include a bust of the goddess Neith in his likeness found in his sun temple at Abusir, now in the Egyptian Museum. This head of Userkaf is 45 cm (18 in) high and carved from greywacke stone. It is considered particularly important as it is among the very few sculptures in the round from the Old Kingdom that show the monarch wearing the Deshret of Lower Egypt. (Note: With catalog number JE 90220.) The head was uncovered in 1957 during the joint excavation expedition of the German and Swiss Institutes of Cairo. Another head which might belong to Userkaf, wearing the Hedjet of Upper Egypt and made of painted limestone, is in the Cleveland Museum of Art. (Note: The head measures 17.2 cm (6.8 in) in height with a width of 6.5 cm (2.6 in) and a depth of 7.2 cm (2.8 in). Its catalog number is 1979.2. This head of Userkaf closely resembles the depictions of Menkaure on his triads.)

The head of a colossal larger-than-life sphinx statue of Userkaf, now in the Egyptian Museum, was found in the temple courtyard of his mortuary complex at Saqqara by Cecil Mallaby Firth in 1928. This colossal head of pink Aswan granite shows the king wearing the nemes headdress with a cobra on his forehead. It is the largest surviving head dating to the Old Kingdom other than that of the Great Sphinx of Giza and the only colossal royal statue from this period. Many more fragments of statues of the king made of diorite, slate and granite but none of limestone have been found at the same site. Some bore Userkaf's cartouche and Horus name.

Kozloff notes the youthful features of Userkaf on most of his representations and concludes that if these are good indications of his age, then he might have come to the throne as an adolescent and died in his early twenties.

== Sun temple ==
Layout of Userkaf's sun temple after its completion by Sahure or Neferirkare Kakai; 1. obelisk, 2. obelisk pedestal, 3. statue shrines, 4. court open to the sun, 5. altar, 6. outbuilding, 7. causeway, 8. valley temple.

=== Significance ===
Userkaf is the first pharaoh to build a dedicated temple to the sun god Ra in the Memphite necropolis north of Abusir, on a promontory on the desert edge just south of the modern locality of Abu Gurab. Works might have started during Userkaf's fifth or sixth year of reign. The only plausible precedent for Userkaf's sun temple was the temple associated with the Great Sphinx of Giza, which may have been dedicated to Ra and may thus have served similar purposes. In any case, Userkaf's successors for the next 80 years followed his course of action: sun temples were built by all subsequent Fifth Dynasty pharaohs until Menkauhor Kaiu, with the possible exception of Shepseskare, whose reign might have been too short to build one. Userkaf's choice of Abusir as the site of his sun temple has not been satisfactorily explained, the site being of no particular significance up to that point. (Note: Verner and Zemina report that some Egyptologists, whom they do not name, have proposed that Abusir was chosen as the southernmost point from which one may have been able to glimpse the sun above the obelisk of the religious center of Ra in Heliopolis. This observation is contested by Goedicke for whom "the supposed proximity to Heliopolis for the choice of the site hardly played a role". Grimal instead conjectures that Abusir was chosen for its proximity to Sakhebu, a locality some 10 km (6.2 mi) north of Abu Rawash, which is mentioned in various sources such as the Westcar papyrus as a cult center of Ra and which may have been the home town of Userkaf's father, in the hypothesis that he was a grandson of Djedefre.) Userkaf's choice may (Note: Verner and Zemina are convinced that the presence of Userkaf's sun temple in Abusir explains the subsequent development of the necropolis, but Goedicke sees this only as a "vague association" leaving the choice of Abusir as royal necropolis "inexplicable".) have influenced subsequent kings of the Fifth Dynasty who made Abusir the royal necropolis until the reign of Menkauhor Kaiu.

For the Egyptologist Hans Goedicke, Userkaf's decision to build a temple for the setting sun separated from his own mortuary complex is a manifestation of and response to sociopolitical tensions, if not turmoil, at the end of the Fourth Dynasty. The construction of the sun temple permitted a distinction between the king's personal afterlife and religious issues pertaining to the setting sun, which had been so closely intertwined in the pyramid complexes of Giza and in the pharaohs of the Fourth Dynasty. Thus, Userkaf's pyramid would be isolated in Saqqara, not even surrounded by a wider cemetery for his contemporaries, while the sun temple would serve the social need for a solar cult, which, while represented by the king, would not be exclusively embodied by him anymore. Malek similarly sees the construction of sun temples as marking a shift from the royal cult, which was so preponderant during the early Fourth Dynasty, to the cult of the sun god Ra. A result of these changes is that the king was now primarily revered as the son of Ra.

=== Name ===
The ancient Egyptians called Userkaf's sun temple Nekhenre (Nḫn Rˁ.w), which has been variously translated as "The fortress of Ra", "The stronghold of Ra", "The residence of Ra", "Ra's storerooms" and "The birthplace of Ra". According to Coppens, Janák, Lehner, Verner, Vymazalová, Wilkinson and Zemina, Nḫn here might actually refer instead to the town of Nekhen, also known as Hierakonpolis. Hierakonpolis was a stronghold and seat of power for the late predynastic kings who unified Egypt. They propose that Userkaf may have chosen this name to emphasise the victorious and unifying nature of the cult of Ra or, at least, to represent some symbolic meaning in relation to kingship. Nekhen was also the name of an institution responsible for providing resources to the living king as well as to his funerary cult after his death. In consequence, the true meaning of Nekhenre might be closer to "Ra's Nekhen" or "The Hierakonpolis of Ra".

=== Function ===
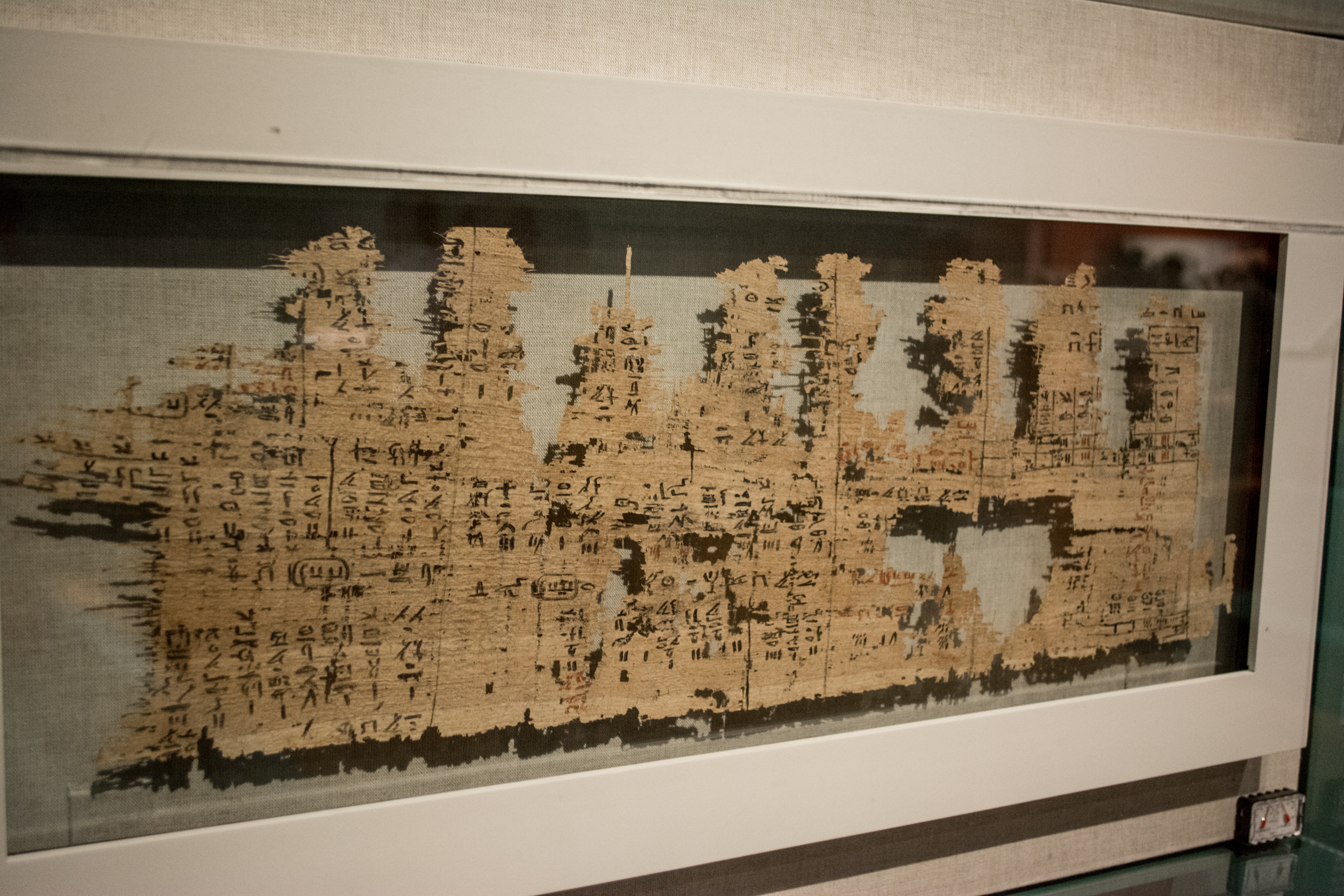
The Abusir Papyri indicate that the cults taking place at the sun temple and mortuary complex of the king were closely related.

The sun temple of Userkaf first appears as pyramid XVII in Karl Richard Lepsius' pioneering list of pyramids in the mid-19th century. Its true nature was recognised by Ludwig Borchardt in the early 20th century but it was only thoroughly excavated from 1954 until 1957 by a team including Hanns Stock, Werner Kaiser, Peter Kaplony, Wolfgang Helck, and Herbert Ricke. According to the royal annals, the construction of the temple started in Userkaf's fifth year on the throne and, on that occasion, he donated 24 royal domains for the maintenance of the temple.

Userkaf's sun temple covered an area of 44 m × 83 m (144 ft × 272 ft) and was oriented to the west. It served primarily as a place of worship for the mortuary cult of Ra and was supposed to relate it to the royal funerary cult. Structurally, the sun temple and the royal mortuary complex were very similar, as they included a valley temple close to the Nile and a causeway leading up to the high temple on the desert plateau. In other ways their architectures differed. For example, the valley temple of the sun temple complex is not oriented to any cardinal point, rather pointing vaguely to Heliopolis, and the causeway is not aligned with the axis of the high temple. The Abusir Papyri, a collection of administrative documents from later in the Fifth Dynasty, indicates that the cultic activities taking place in the sun and mortuary temples were related; for instance, offerings for both cults were dispatched from the sun temple. In fact, sun temples built during this period were meant to play for Ra the same role that the pyramid played for the king. They were funerary temples for the sun god, where his renewal and rejuvenation, necessary to maintain the order of the world, could take place. Rites performed in the temple were thus primarily concerned with Ra's creator function as well as his role as father of the king. During his lifetime, the king would appoint his closest officials to the running of the temple, allowing them to benefit from the temple's income and thus ensuring their loyalty. After the pharaoh's death, the sun temple's income would be associated with the pyramid complex, supporting the royal funerary cult.

Construction works on the Nekhenre did not stop with Userkaf's death but continued in at least four building phases, the first of which may have taken place under Sahure, and then under his successors Neferirkare Kakai and Nyuserre Ini. By the end of Userkaf's rule, the sun temple did not yet house the large granite obelisk on a pedestal that it would subsequently acquire. Instead its main temple seems to have comprised a rectangular enclosure wall with a high mast set on a mound in its center, possibly as a perch for the sun god's falcon. To the east of this mound was a mudbrick altar with statue shrines on both sides. According to the royal annals, from his sixth year on the throne, Userkaf commanded that two oxen and two geese were to be sacrificed daily in the Nekhenre. These animals seem to have been butchered in or around the high temple, the causeway being wide enough to lead live oxen up it. In addition to these sacrifices Userkaf endowed his sun temple with vast agricultural estates amounting to 34,655 acres (14,024 ha) of land, which Klaus Baer describes as "an enormous and quite unparalleled gift for the Old Kingdom". Kozloff sees these decisions as a manifestation of Userkaf's young age and of the power of the priesthood of Ra rather than as a result of his personal devotion to the sun god.

== Pyramid complex ==
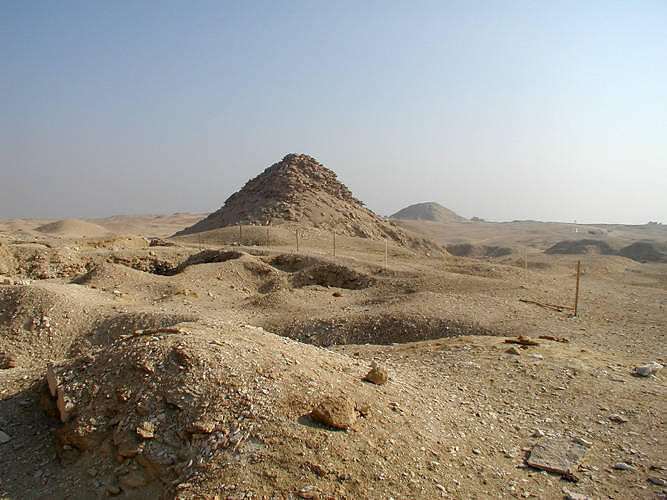
The ruined pyramid of Userkaf at Saqqara

=== Pyramid of Userkaf ===
==== Location ====
Unlike most pharaohs of the Fourth Dynasty, Userkaf built a modest pyramid at North Saqqara, at the north-eastern edge of the enclosure wall surrounding Djoser's pyramid complex. This decision, probably political, may be connected to the return to the city of Memphis as center of government, of which Saqqara to the west is the necropolis, as well as a desire to rule according to principles and methods closer to Djoser's. In particular, like Djoser's and unlike the pyramid complexes of Giza, Userkaf's mortuary complex is not surrounded by a necropolis for his followers. For Goedicke, the wider religious role played by Fourth Dynasty pyramids was now to be played by the sun temple, while the king's mortuary complex was to serve only the king's personal funerary needs. Hence, Userkaf's choice of Saqqara is a manifestation of a return to a "harmonious and altruistic" notion of kingship which Djoser seemed to have symbolized, against that represented by Khufu who had almost personally embodied the sun-god. (Note: Goedicke also notes that the line passing through Userkaf's pyramid and sun temple also passes through the apex of Khufu's pyramid in Giza, an alignment which he believes must be intentional, yet cannot explain.)

==== Pyramid architecture ====
Userkaf's pyramid complex was called Wab-Isut Userkaf, meaning "Pure are the places of Userkaf" or "Userkaf's pyramid, holiest of places". The pyramid originally reached a height of 49 m (161 ft) for a base-side of 73.3 m (240 ft). By volume, this made it the second smallest king's pyramid finished during the Fifth Dynasty after that of the final ruler, Unas. The reduced size of the pyramid as compared to those of Userkaf's Fourth Dynasty predecessors owes much to the rise of the cult of Ra which diverted spiritual and financial resources away from the king's burial. The pyramid was built following techniques established during the Fourth Dynasty, with a core made of stones rather than employing rubble as in subsequent pyramids of the Fifth and Sixth Dynasties. The core was so poorly laid out, however, that once the pyramid's outer casing of fine limestone had been robbed, it crumbled into a heap of rubble. The burial chamber was lined with large limestone blocks, its roof made of gabled limestone beams.

=== Mortuary temple ===
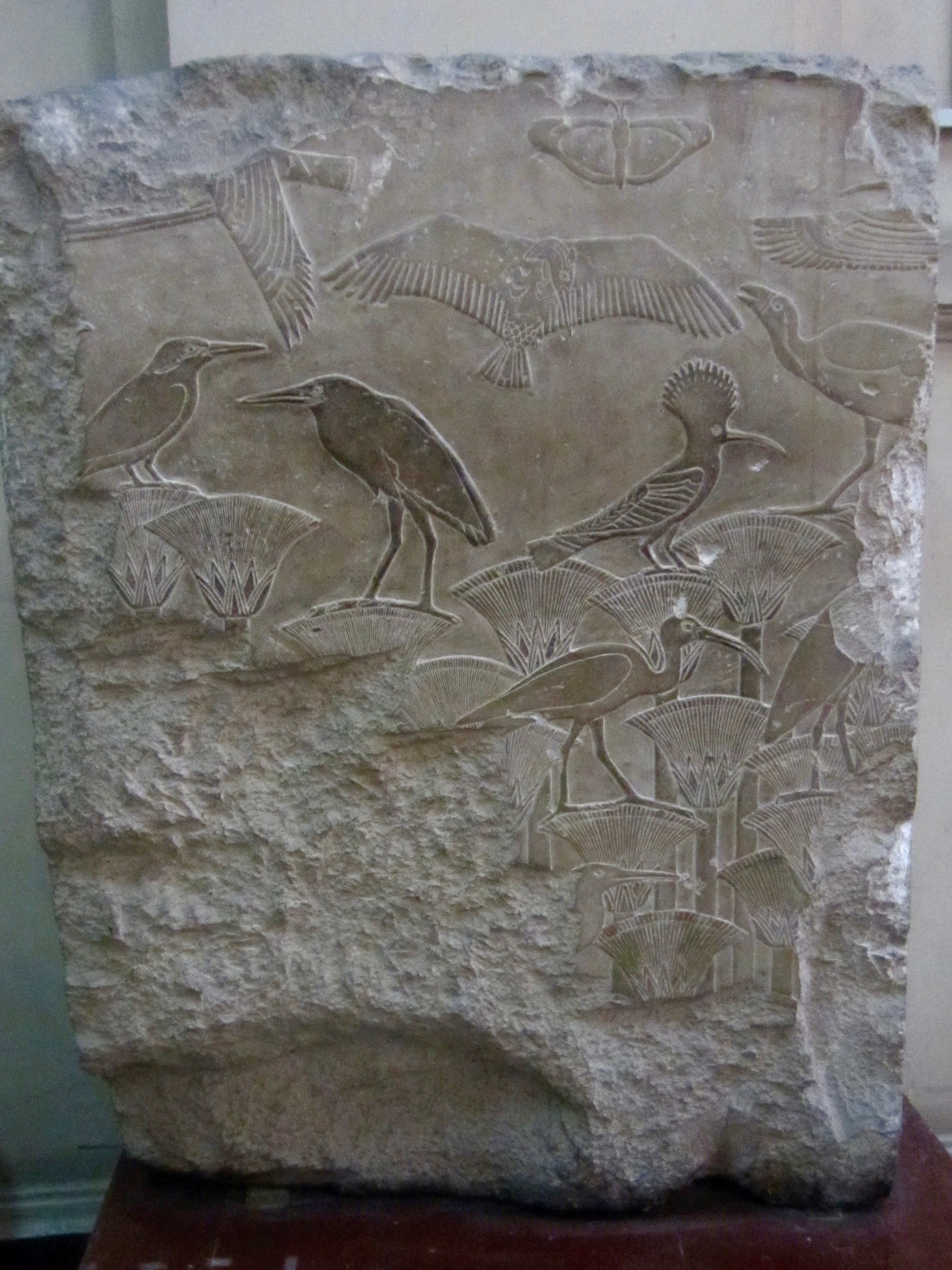
Relief from Userkaf's mortuary temple, originally painted

The pyramid's funerary complex is peculiar in that Userkaf's mortuary temple is located on the southern side rather than the usual eastern one. This was almost certainly due to the presence of a large moat surrounding Djoser's pyramid and running to the east as proposed by Verner, or to the general topography of Saqqara and the presence of older tombs in the vicinity as expounded by Edwards and Lauer. In any case, this means that Userkaf chose to be buried in close proximity to Djoser even though this implied that he could not use the normal layout for his temple. Rainer Stadelmann believes that the reason for the choices of location and layout were practical and due to the presence of the necropolis's administrative center on the north-east corner of Djoser's complex. Verner rather identifies a desire on Userkaf's behalf to benefit from the religious significance of Djoser's complex. Alternatively, Userkaf's decision to locate the temple on the pyramid's southern side may be motivated by entirely religious reasons, with the Egyptologists Herbert Ricke and Richard H. Wilkinson proposing that it could have ensured the temple's year-round exposure to the sun, while Altenmüller suggests it was aligned with an obelisk that could have been located nearby.

The mortuary temple walls were extensively adorned with raised reliefs of exceptional quality. Scant remains of pigments on some reliefs show that these reliefs were originally painted. Userkaf's pyramid temple represents an important innovation in this respect; he was the first pharaoh to introduce nature scenes in his funerary temple, including scenes of hunting in the marshes that would subsequently become common. The artistic work is highly detailed, with a single relief showing no less than seven different species of birds and a butterfly. Hunting scenes symbolised the victory of the king over the forces of chaos (problematic interpretation since "chaos" is primeval matter, not source of evil. The modern definition doesn't meet the original sense of the word. The Ancient Greeks never knew something like "victory of the chaos", this is the invention of modern scholars, not ancient people's), and might thus have illustrated Userkaf's role as Iry-Maat, that is "the one who establishes Maat", which was one of Userkaf's names.

The funerary complex of Userkaf was accessed from the Nile via a valley temple connected to the mortuary temple with a causeway. This valley temple is yet to be excavated.

== Pyramid complex of Neferhetepes ==
=== Pyramid ===
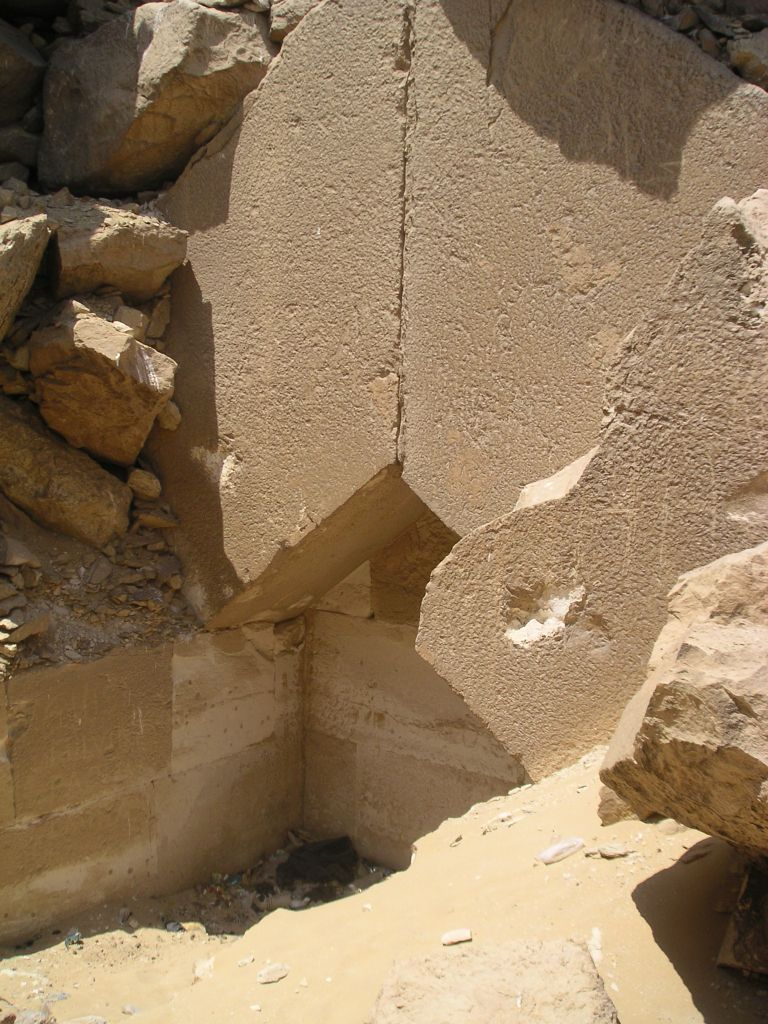
The funerary chamber of the queen's pyramid exposed by stone robbers

Some 10 m (33 ft) to the south of Userkaf's funerary enclosure, there stands a separate pyramid complex built in all likelihood for one of his queens. The pyramid, built on an east–west axis, is ruined and only a small mound of rubble can be seen today. Although no name has been identified in the pyramid proper, its owner is believed by Egyptologists including Cecil Mallaby Firth, Bernard Grdseloff, Audran Labrousse (fr), Jean-Philippe Lauer and Tarek El-Awady to have been Neferhetepes, mother of Sahure and in all probability Userkaf's consort.

The pyramid was originally some 17 m (56 ft) high with a slope of 52°, similar to that of Userkaf's, and a base 26.25 m (86.1 ft) long. The core of the main and cult pyramids were built with the same technique, consisting of three horizontal layers of roughly hewn local limestone blocks and gypsum mortar. The core was covered with an outer casing of fine Tura limestone, now gone. The pyramid was so extensively used as a stone quarry that even its internal chambers are exposed. These chambers are a scaled-down version of those in Userkaf's main pyramid, but without storage rooms.

=== Mortuary temple ===
The queen's pyramid complex had its own separate mortuary temple, located on the pyramid eastern side. The temple entrance led to an open pillared courtyard, stretching from east to west, where the ritual cleaning and preparation of the offerings took place. A sacrificial chapel adjoined the pyramid side and there were three statue niches and a few magazine chambers to store offerings. The temple halls were adorned with reliefs of animal processions and carriers of offerings moving towards the shrine of the queen.

== Legacy ==
=== Funerary cult ===
==== Old Kingdom ====
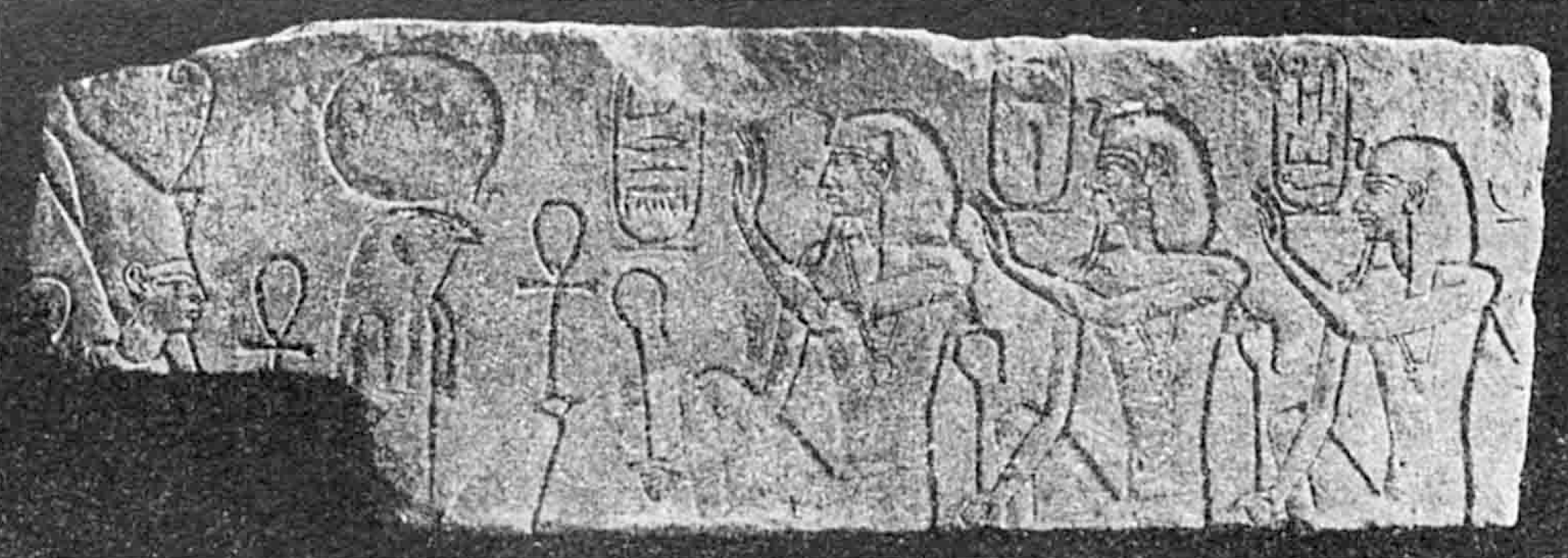
Relief from a Saqqara tomb dating to the Ramesside Period showing, from left to right, Djoser, Teti and Userkaf

Like other Fourth and Fifth Dynasty pharaohs, Userkaf received a funerary cult after his death. His cult was state-sponsored and relied on goods for offerings produced in dedicated agricultural estates established during his lifetime, as well as such resources as fabrics brought from the "house of silver" (the treasury).

The cult flourished in the early to mid-Fifth Dynasty, as evidenced by the tombs and seals of participating priests and officials such as Nykaure, who served in the cults of Userkaf and Neferefre; Nykaankh and Khnumhotep, who served in Userkaf's pyramid complex; Ptahhotep, a priest of the Nekhenre and of Userkaf's mortuary temple; Tepemankh, Nenkheftka and Senuankh, who served in the cults of Userkaf and Sahure; Pehenukai, a vizier under Sahure and Neferirkare Kakai; and Nykuhor, a judge, inspector of scribes, privy councillor, and priest of funerary cults of Userkaf and Neferefre.

==== Middle Kingdom ====
The long-term importance of Userkaf's official cult may be judged by its abandonment at the end of the Fifth Dynasty. In comparison, the official funerary cult of at least one of Userkaf's successors, Nyuserre Ini, may have lasted until the Middle Kingdom period. The mortuary temple of Userkaf must have been in ruins or dismantled by the time of the Twelfth Dynasty as indicated, for example, by a block showing the king performing a ritual found re-used as a construction material in the pyramid of Amenemhat I. Userkaf was not the only king whose mortuary temple met this fate: Nyuserre's temple was targeted even though its last priests were serving in it around this time. These facts hint at a lapse of royal interest in the state-sponsored funerary cults of Old Kingdom rulers.

==== Later periods ====
Examples of personal devotions on behalf of pious individuals endured much longer. For example, Userkaf is depicted on a relief from the Saqqara tomb of the priest Mehu, who lived during the Ramesside period (c. 1292–1189 BCE). Early in this period, during the reign of Ramesses II, Ramesses's fourth son, Khaemwaset (fl. c. 1280–1225 BCE), ordered restoration work on Userkaf's pyramid as well as on other pyramids of the Fifth Dynasty. In the case of Userkaf, this is established by inscriptions on stone cladding from the pyramid field showing Khaemwaset with offering bearers.

The reliefs from Userkaf's funerary complex were copied during the 26th Dynasty of the Late Period. A particular example is a relief showing Userkaf wearing a boatman's circlet with streamers and urae with the horns of an Atef crown, a motif which had disappeared from Egyptian arts since Userkaf's time.

=== In contemporary culture ===
Egyptian Nobel Prize for Literature-laureate Naguib Mahfouz published a short story in 1945 about Userkaf entitled "Afw al-malik Usirkaf: uqsusa misriya". This short story was translated by Raymond Stock as "King Userkaf's Forgiveness" in the collection of short stories Sawt min al-ʻalam al-akhar, whose title translates to Voices from the other world: ancient Egyptian tales.

== Gallery ==
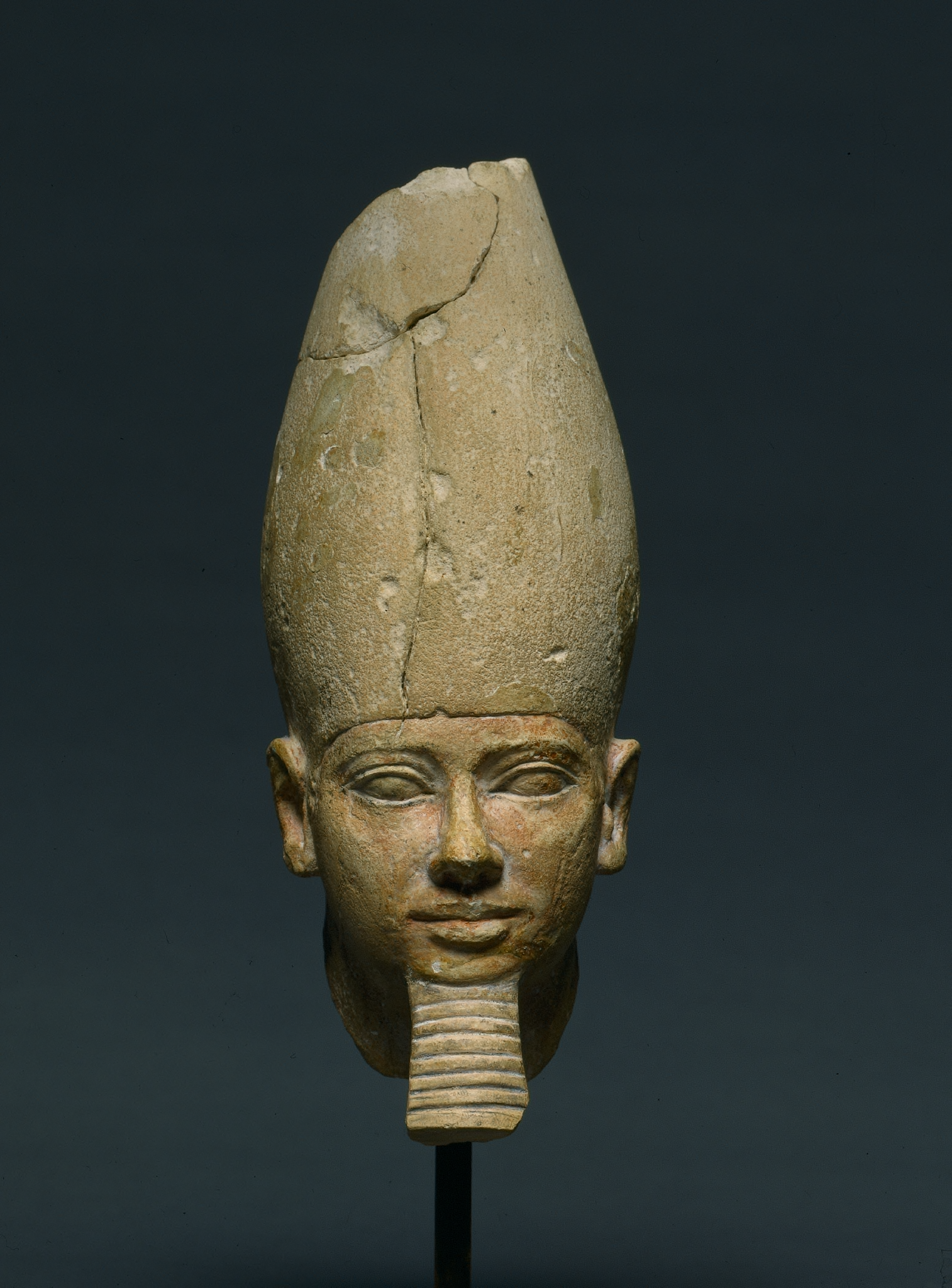
Egypt, Old Kingdom, Dynasty 5, reign of Userkaf - Head of King Userkaf - 1979.2 - Cleveland Museum of Art

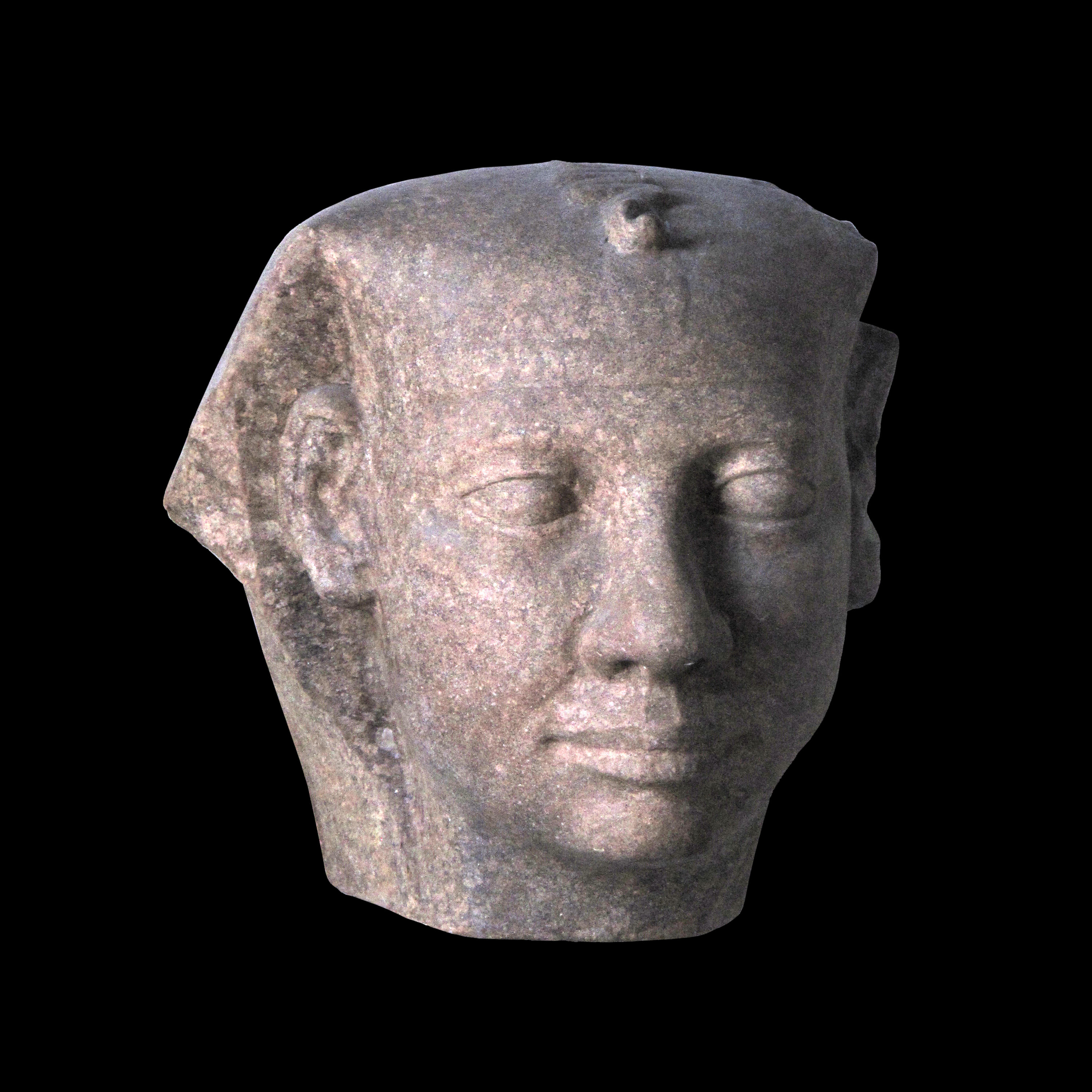
A copy in the University of Lausanne of a head of a colossal statue of Userkaf, found near his pyramid at Saqqara. The original statue head is in the Egyptian Museum in Cairo (JE 52501)

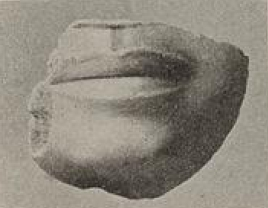
Fragment of an alabaster statue of Userkaf from his sun temple, now at the Egyptian Museum of Berlin

== Notes, references and sources ==
=== Sources ===
- Allen, James; Allen, Susan; Anderson, Julie; et al. (1999). Egyptian Art in the Age of the Pyramids. New York: The Metropolitan Museum of Art. ISBN 978-0-8109-6543-0. OCLC 41431623.
- Altenmüller, Hartwig (1995). Kessler, Dieter; Schulz, Regine (eds.). "Die "Abgaben" aus dem 2. Jahr des Userkaf". Münchner Ägyptologische Untersuchungen, Gedenkschrift für Winfried Barta (in German). 4: 37–48. OCLC 811863261.
- Altenmüller, Hartwig (2001). "Old Kingdom: Fifth Dynasty". In Redford, Donald B. (ed.). The Oxford Encyclopedia of Ancient Egypt, Volume 2. Oxford: Oxford University Press. pp. 597–601. ISBN 978-0-19-510234-5.
- Arnold, Dieter (1996). Die Tempel Ägyptens: Götterwohnungen, Baudenkmäler, Kultstätten (in German). Augsburg: Bechtermünz. ISBN 978-3-86-047215-6.
- Arnold, Dieter (2001). "Tombs: Royal tombs". In Redford, Donald B. (ed.). The Oxford Encyclopedia of Ancient Egypt, Volume 3. Oxford: Oxford University Press. pp. 425–433. ISBN 978-0-19-510234-5.
- Arnold, Dieter (2003). The encyclopaedia of ancient Egyptian architecture. London: I. B. Tauris. ISBN 978-1-86064-465-8.
- Arnold, Dorothea (19 July 1999). "Old Kingdom Chronology and List of Kings". Metropolitan Museum of Art.
- Baer, Klaus (1956). "A Note on Egyptian Units of Area in the Old Kingdom". Journal of Near Eastern Studies. XV.
- Bareš, Ladislav (2000). "The destruction of the monuments at the necropolis of Abusir". In Bárta, Miroslav; Krejčí, Jaromír (eds.). Abusir and Saqqara in the Year 2000. Prague: Academy of Sciences of the Czech Republic – Oriental Institute. pp. 1–16. ISBN 80-85425-39-4.
- Bárta, Miroslav (2017). "Radjedef to the Eighth Dynasty". UCLA Encyclopedia of Egyptology.
- Baud, Michel; Dobrev, Vassil (1995). "De nouvelles annales de l'Ancien Empire Egyptien. Une "Pierre de Palerme" pour la VIe dynastie" (PDF). Bulletin de l'Institut Français d'Archéologie Orientale (in French). 95: 23–92. ISSN 0255-0962. Archived from the original on 2 April 2015.
- Baud, Michel (1999a). Famille Royale et pouvoir sous l'Ancien Empire égyptien. Tome 1 (PDF). Bibliothèque d'étude 126/1 (in French). Cairo: Institut français d'archéologie orientale. ISBN 978-2-7247-0250-7. Archived from the original (PDF) on 29 December 2019.
- Baud, Michel (1999b). Famille Royale et pouvoir sous l'Ancien Empire égyptien. Tome 2 (PDF). Bibliothèque d'étude 126/2 (in French). Cairo: Institut français d'archéologie orientale. ISBN 978-2-7247-0250-7. Archived from the original (PDF) on 2 April 2015.
- Beckerath, Jürgen von (1982). "Niuserre". In Helck, Wolfgang; Otto, Eberhard (eds.). Lexikon der Ägyptologie. Band IV: Megiddo – Pyramiden (in German). Wiesbaden: Harrassowitz. pp. 517–518. ISBN 978-3-447-02262-0.
- Beckerath, Jürgen von (1997). Chronologie des pharaonischen Ägypten: die Zeitbestimmung der ägyptischen Geschichte von der Vorzeit bis 332 v. Chr. Münchner Ägyptologische Studien (in German). Vol. 46. Mainz am Rhein: Verlag Philipp von Zabern. ISBN 978-3-80-532310-9.
- Beckerath, Jürgen von (1999). Handbuch der ägyptischen Königsnamen. Münchner ägyptologische Studien (in German). Vol. 49. Mainz: Philip von Zabern. ISBN 978-3-8053-2591-2.
- Bennett, John (1966). "Pyramid Names". The Journal of Egyptian Archaeology. 52. Sage Publications: 174–176. doi:10.1177/030751336605200122. JSTOR 3855832. S2CID 221765432.
- Breasted, James Henry (1906). Ancient records of Egypt historical documents from earliest times to the persian conquest, collected edited and translated with commentary. Chicago: The University of Chicago press. OCLC 778206509.
- Burkard, Günter; Thissen, Heinz Josef; Quack, Joachim Friedrich (2003). Einführung in die altägyptische Literaturgeschichte. Band 1: Altes und Mittleres Reich. Einführungen und Quellentexte zur Ägyptologie. Vol. 1, 3, 6. Münster: LIT. ISBN 978-3-82-580987-4.
- Clayton, Peter (1994). Chronicle of the Pharaohs. London: Thames & Hudson. ISBN 978-0-500-05074-3.
- Daressy, Georges (1912). "La Pierre de Palerme et la chronologie de l'Ancien Empire". Bulletin de l'Institut Français d'Archéologie Orientale (in French). 12. Cairo: 161–214. ISSN 0255-0962.
- David, Ann Rosalie; David, Antony E (2001). A Biographical Dictionary of Ancient Egypt. London: Seaby. ISBN 978-1-85-264032-3.
- Desplancques, Sophie (2006). L'institution du Trésor en Egypte: Des origines à la fin du Moyen Empire. Passé Présent (in French). Paris: Presses de l'Université Paris-Sorbonne. ISBN 978-2-84-050451-1.
- Dodson, Aidan; Hilton, Dyan (2004). The Complete Royal Families of Ancient Egypt. London: Thames & Hudson Ltd. ISBN 978-0-500-05128-3.
- Dorman, Peter (2002). "The biographical inscription of Ptahshepses from Saqqara: A newly identified fragment". Journal of Egyptian Archaeology. 88: 95–110. doi:10.1177/030751330208800107. JSTOR 3822338. S2CID 193353936.
- Edel, Elmar; Ricke, Herbert (1965). Das Sonnenheiligtum des Königs Userkaf. Beiträge zur ägyptischen Bauforschung und Altertumskunde (in German). Vol. 7, 8. Kairo: Schweizerisches Institut für ägyptische Bauforschung und Altertumskunde. OCLC 77668521.
- Edwards, David (2004). The Nubian Past. Oxon: Routledge. ISBN 978-0-41-536988-6.
- El-Awady, Tarek (2006). "The royal family of Sahure. New evidence." ( (PDF)). In Bárta, Miroslav; Krejčí, Jaromír (eds.). Abusir and Saqqara in the Year 2005. Prague: Academy of Sciences of the Czech Republic, Oriental Institute. pp. 191–218. ISBN 978-80-7308-116-4. Archived from the original on 1 February 2011.
- El-Khouly, Aly (1978). "Excavations at the Pyramid of Userkaf, 1976: Preliminary Report". The Journal of Egyptian Archaeology. 64 (1): 35–43. doi:10.1177/030751337806400105. S2CID 192383294.
- El-Shahawy, Abeer; Atiya, Farid S. (2005). The Egyptian Museum in Cairo. A Walk Through The Alleys of Ancient Egypt. Cairo: Farid Atiya Press. ISBN 978-9-77-171983-0.
- Gauthier, Henri (1906). "Note et remarques historiques III: Un nouveau nom royal". Bulletin de l'Institut Français d'Archéologie Orientale (in French). 5: 41–57. ISSN 0255-0962.
- Goedicke, Hans (1967). Königliche Dokumente aus den Alten Reich. Ägyptologische Abhandlungen (in German). Vol. 14. Wiesbaden: Harrassowitz. OCLC 4877029.
- Goedicke, Hans (2000). "Abusir–Saqqara–Giza". In Bárta, Miroslav; Krejčí, Jaromír (eds.). Abusir and Saqqara in the year 2000. Archiv Orientální, Supplementa. Vol. 9. Prague: Academy of Sciences of the Czech Republic, Oriental Institute. pp. 397–412. ISBN 978-8-08-542539-0.
- Grimal, Nicolas (1992). A History of Ancient Egypt. Translated by Ian Shaw. Hoboken, New Jersey: Wiley-Blackwell. ISBN 978-0-631-19396-8.
- Guerrier, Éric (2006). Les pyramides: l'enquête (in French). Coudray-Macouard: Cheminements, DL. ISBN 978-2-84-478446-9.
- Gundlach, Rolf (2001). "Temples". In Redford, Donald B. (ed.). The Oxford Encyclopedia of Ancient Egypt, Volume 3. Oxford: Oxford University Press. pp. 363–379. ISBN 978-0-19-510234-5.
- Hall, Henry Reginald (1913). Catalogue of the Egyptian Scarabs, etc. in the British Museum. London: The British Museum. OCLC 163313959.
- Hayes, William (1978). The Scepter of Egypt: A Background for the Study of the Egyptian Antiquities in The Metropolitan Museum of Art. Vol. 1, From the Earliest Times to the End of the Middle Kingdom. New York: Metropolitan Museum of Art. OCLC 7427345.
- "Head of King Userkaf, c. 2454–2447 BC". The Cleveland Museum of Art.
- Helck, Wolfgang (1981). Geschichte des alten Ägypten. Handbuch der Orientalistik. Abt. 1: Der Nahe und Mittlere Osten (in German). Vol. 1. Leiden, Köln: Brill. ISBN 978-9-00-406497-3.
- Hellouin de Cenival, Jean-Louis; Posener-Krieger, Paule (1968). The Abusir Papyri, Series of Hieratic Texts. London: British Museum. OCLC 899032263.
- Hornung, Erik; Krauss, Rolf; Warburton, David, eds. (2012). Ancient Egyptian Chronology. Handbook of Oriental Studies. Leiden, Boston: Brill. ISBN 978-90-04-11385-5. ISSN 0169-9423.
- Janák, Jiří; Vymazalová, Hana; Coppens, Filip (2011). "The Fifth Dynasty 'sun temples' in a broader context". In Bárta, Miroslav; Coppens, Filip; Krejčí, Jaromír (eds.). Abusir and Saqqara in the Year 2010. Prague: Charles University in Prague, Faculty of Arts. pp. 430–442. ISBN 978-8-07-308385-4.
- Jánosi, Peter (2016). The Pyramid Complex of Amenemhat I at Lisht, The Reliefs. New Haven, London: The Metropolitan Museum of Art, Yale University Press. ISBN 978-1-58839-605-1.
- Kaiser, Werner (1956). "Zu den Sonnenheiligtümern der 5. Dynastie". Mitteilungen des Deutschen Archäologischen Instituts, Abteilung Kairo. 14: 104–116. ISSN 0342-1279.
- Kaplony, Peter (1981). Die Rollsiegel des Alten Reiches. Katalog der Rollsiegel II. Allgemeiner Teil mit Studien zum Köningtum des Alten Reichs II. Katalog der Rollsiegel A. Text B. Tafeln (in German). Bruxelles: Fondation Egyptologique Reine Élisabeth. ISBN 978-0-583-00301-8.
- Kozloff, Arielle P. (1982). "Weserkaf, Boy King of Dynasty V". The Bulletin of the Cleveland Museum of Art. 69 (7): 211–223. JSTOR 25159780.
- Labrousse, Audran; Lauer, Jean-Philippe (2000). Les complexes funéraires d'Ouserkaf et de Néferhétepès. Bibliothèque d'étude, Institut d'archéologie orientale, Le Caire (in French). Vol. 130. Cairo: Institut français d'archéologie orientale. ISBN 978-2-72-470263-7.
- Lehner, Mark (2008). The Complete Pyramids. London: Thames & Hudson Ltd. ISBN 978-0-500-05084-2.
- Leprohon, Ronald J. (2013). The Great Name: Ancient Egyptian Royal Titulary. Writings from the Ancient World. Vol. 33. Atlanta: Society of Biblical Literature. ISBN 978-1-58983-736-2.
- Lepsius, Karl Richard (1972). Denkmäler aus Ægypten und Æthiopien (in German). Geneva: Éditions de Belles-Lettres. OCLC 941020412.
- "List of Rulers of Ancient Egypt and Nubia". Metropolitan Museum of Art online collections.
- Magi, Giovanna (2008). Saqqara: the Pyramid, the Mastabas and the Archaeological Site. Firenze: Bonechi. ISBN 978-8-84-761500-7.
- Mahfouz, Naguib (2006). Voices from the Other World : Ancient Egyptian Tales. Cairo, New York: American University in Cairo Press. ISBN 978-9-77-416029-5.
- Malek, Jaromír (2000a). "The Old Kingdom (c.2160–2055 BC)". In Shaw, Ian (ed.). The Oxford History of Ancient Egypt. Oxford University Press. pp. 83–107. ISBN 978-0-19-815034-3.
- Malek, Jaromir (2000b). "Old Kingdom rulers as "local saints" in the Memphite area during the Old Kingdom". In Bárta, Miroslav; Krejčí, Jaromír (eds.). Abusir and Saqqara in the Year 2000. Prag: Academy of Sciences of the Czech Republic – Oriental Institute. pp. 241–258. ISBN 978-80-85425-39-0.
- Mariette, Auguste (1889a). Maspero, Gaston (ed.). Les mastabas de l'ancien empire, fragments du dernier ouvrage d'Auguste Édouard Mariette (in French). Paris: Friedrich Vieweg. OCLC 2654989.
- Mariette, Auguste (1889b). Maspero, Gaston (ed.). Monuments divers recueillis en Egypte et en Nubie (in French). Paris: F. Vieweg. OCLC 633703310.
- Morales, Antonio J. (2006). "Traces of official and popular veneration to Nyuserra Iny at Abusir. Late Fifth Dynasty to the Middle Kingdom". In Bárta, Miroslav; Coppens, Filip; Krejčí, Jaromír (eds.). Abusir and Saqqara in the Year 2005, Proceedings of the Conference held in Prague (June 27–July 5, 2005). Prague: Academy of Sciences of the Czech Republic, Oriental Institute. pp. 311–341. ISBN 978-80-7308-116-4.
- Nuzzolo, Massimilano (2007). "Sun Temples and Kingship in the Ancient Egyptian Kingdom". In Goyon, Jean Claude; Cardin, Christine (eds.). Actes du neuvième congrès international des égyptologues, Grenoble 6-12 Septembre 2004. Orientalia Lovaniensia analecta (in French). Vol. 150. Leuven, Dudley MA: Peeters. pp. 1401–1410. ISBN 978-9-04-291717-0.
- "Oarsmen and an Official ca. 2465–2458 B.C." Metropolitan Museum of Art online collections.
- Petrie, Flinders (1897). A History of Egypt. Volume I: From the Earliest Times to the XVIth Dynasty (third ed.). London: Methuen & Co. OCLC 493045619.
- Petrie, Flinders (1917). Scarabs and Cylinders with Names: Illustrated by the Egyptian Collection in University College, London (PDF). London: British School of Archaeology in Egypt, University College: Bernard Quaritch. OCLC 55858240.
- Quirke, Stephen (2001). The Cult of Ra : Sun-Worship in Ancient Egypt. New York: Thames & Hudson. ISBN 978-0-50-005107-8.
- Redford, Donald B. (2001). "Manetho". In Redford, Donald B. (ed.). The Oxford Encyclopedia of Ancient Egypt, Volume 2. Oxford: Oxford University Press. pp. 336–337. ISBN 978-0-19-510234-5.
- "Relief with running troops ca. 2465–2458 B.C." Metropolitan Museum of Art online collections.
- "Relief Fragment with a Ship Under Sail ca. 2465–2458 B.C." Metropolitan Museum of Art online collections.
- Rice, Michael (1999). Who is Who in Ancient Egypt. London & New York: Routledge. ISBN 978-0-203-44328-6.
- Sethe, Kurt Heinrich (1903). Urkunden des Alten Reichs (in German). Wikipedia entry: Urkunden des Alten Reichs. Leipzig: J.C. Hinrichs. OCLC 846318602.
- Stadelmann, Rainer (2007). "Der Kopf des Userkaf aus dem "Taltempel" des Sonnenheiligtums in Abusir". Sokar (in German). 15: 56–61. ISSN 1438-7956.
- Strudwick, Nigel (1985). The Administration of Egypt in the Old Kingdom: The Highest Titles and Their Holders (PDF). Studies in Egyptology. London; Boston: Kegan Paul International. ISBN 978-0-7103-0107-9. Archived from the original (PDF) on 3 April 2014.
- Strudwick, Nigel C. (2005). Texts from the Pyramid Age. Writings from the Ancient World (book 16). Atlanta: Society of Biblical Literature. ISBN 978-1-58983-680-8.
- "Userkaf". Digital Egypt. University College London.
- "Userkaf". Encyclopædia Britannica. 20 July 1998.
- Verner, Miroslav (1980a). "Excavations at Abusir". Zeitschrift für Ägyptische Sprache und Altertumskunde. Vol. 107. pp. 158–169. ISSN 2196-713X.
- Verner, Miroslav; Zemina, Milan (1994). Forgotten Pharaohs, Lost Pyramids: Abusir (PDF). Prague: Academia Škodaexport. ISBN 978-80-200-0022-4. Archived from the original on 1 February 2011.
- Verner, Miroslav (1998). Die Pyramiden (in German). Reinbek bei Hamburg: Rowohlt. ISBN 978-3-49-807062-5.
- Verner, Miroslav (2000). "Who was Shepseskara, and when did he reign?" ( (PDF)). In Bárta, Miroslav; Krejčí, Jaromír (eds.). Abusir and Saqqara in the Year 2000. Prague: Academy of Sciences of the Czech Republic, Oriental Institute. pp. 581–602. ISBN 978-80-85425-39-0. Archived from the original on 1 February 2011.
- Verner, Miroslav (2001a). "Archaeological Remarks on the 4th and 5th Dynasty Chronology" (PDF). Archiv Orientální. 69 (3): 363–418. ISSN 0044-8699. Archived from the original (PDF) on 4 March 2016.
- Verner, Miroslav (2001b). "Old Kingdom: An Overview". In Redford, Donald B. (ed.). The Oxford Encyclopedia of Ancient Egypt, Volume 2. Oxford: Oxford University Press. pp. 585–591. ISBN 978-0-19-510234-5.
- Verner, Miroslav (2001c). "Pyramids". In Redford, Donald B. (ed.). The Oxford Encyclopedia of Ancient Egypt, Volume 3. Oxford: Oxford University Press. pp. 87–95. ISBN 978-0-19-510234-5.
- Verner, Miroslav (2002). The Pyramids: The Mystery, Culture and Science of Egypt's Great Monuments. London: Atlantic Books. ISBN 978-1-90-380945-7.
- Verner, Miroslav (2007). "Sahure's Causeway. New Archaeological Discoveries in the Abusir Pyramid Field". Archaeogate Egittologia. ISSN 1973-2953. Archived from the original on 16 July 2011.
- Voß, Susanne (2004). Untersuchungen zu den Sonnenheiligtümern der 5. Dynastie. Bedeutung und Funktion eines singulären Tempeltyps im Alten Reich (PDF) (PhD) (in German). OCLC 76555360.
- Waddell, William Gillan (1971). Manetho. Loeb classical library. Vol. 350. Cambridge, Massachusetts; London: Harvard University Press; W. Heinemann. OCLC 6246102.
- "Weight equal to five deben ca. 2649–2100 B.C." Metropolitan Museum of Art online collections.
- Wildung, Dietrich (1969). Die Rolle ägyptischer Könige im Bewußtsein ihrer Nachwelt. Teil I. Posthume Quellen über die Könige der ersten vier Dynastien. Münchener Ägyptologische Studien (in German). Vol. 17. München, Berlin: Deutscher Kunstverlag. OCLC 698531851.
- Wilkinson, Richard (2000). The Complete Temples of Ancient Egypt. London: Thames & Hudson. ISBN 978-0-50-005100-9.

Preceded by Shepseskaf or Djedefptah	Pharaoh of Egypt; Fifth Dynasty	Succeeded by Sahure
