= Eberhard Otto =

Eberhard Otto may refer to:

- Eberhard Otto (Egyptologist)
- Eberhard Otto (politician)
