= Egyptian sun temple =

Ancient Egyptian temples to the sun god Ra

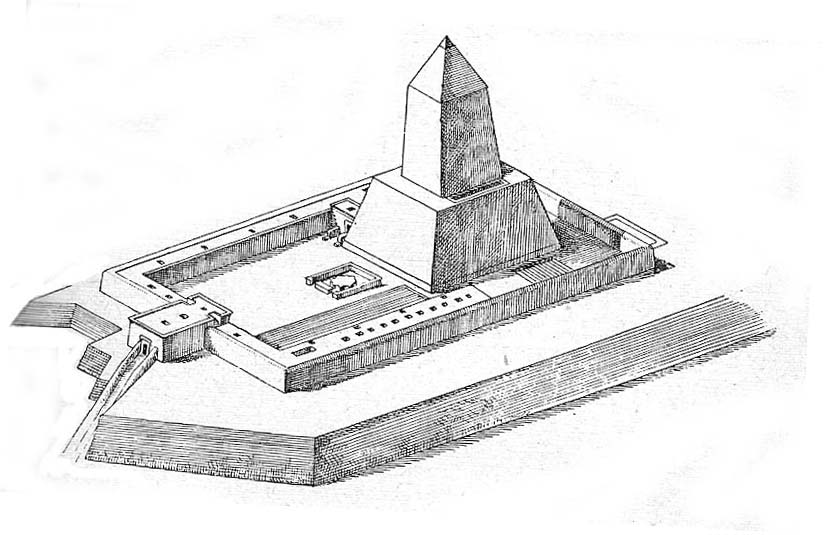
The sun temple of Nyuserre Ini at Abusir

Egyptian sun temples were ancient Egyptian temples to the sun god Ra. The term has come to mostly designate the temples built by six or seven pharaohs of the Fifth Dynasty during the Old Kingdom period. However, sun temples would make a brief reappearance a thousand years later under Akhenaten in the New Kingdom with his building of the Karnak Temple in Thebes.

Fifth Dynasty sun temples were built in two localities, Abu Gorab and Abusir, within 1 km (0.62 mi) of each other and around 15 km (9.3 mi) south of modern-day Cairo. They may have been modeled after an earlier sun temple in Heliopolis. Six or seven temples are thought to have been built, but only two have been uncovered: that of Userkaf and that of Nyuserre. The six kings associated with having built sun temples are: Userkaf, Sahure, Neferirkare Kakai, Reneferef or Neferefre, Nyuserre, and Menkauhor. Djedkare Isesi, the eighth king of the 5th Dynasty, seems to have abruptly stopped the building of sun temples. The uncovered temple of Nyuserre near the village of Abu Gorab still holds impressive remains, in particular the central altarpiece which includes a well-preserved sacrificial altar composed of a number of alabaster parts. The two found sun temples (thus far) are so destroyed that excavators rely mostly on the hieroglyphic signs in the temples' names in order to reconstruct the shape of a characteristic Egyptian sun temple features like the obelisk. However, ruins suggest that these were open air worship structured instead of enclosed.

== Mythology and factual basis ==
According to a tale from Middle Kingdom period, "Tale of Djedi and the Magicians", the first few kings of the Fifth Dynasty were triplets and the actual progeny of the sun god Ra. There appears to be some truth behind this myth: not only were the second and third kings of the fifth dynasty brothers, but these rulers also started an unusually strong devotion to Ra that lasted throughout the V and VI Dynasties.

== Discovery ==
The sun temples' meaning and evolution are ingrained into both the architectural and religious history of the Old Kingdom, specifically the Fifth Dynasty of Egypt and Sixth Dynasty of Egypt. The first sun temple was discovered at the end of the nineteenth century. The first of these temples discovered was Niuserre's. The second excavated was Userkaf's. Study of this type of temple did not really start until the 1950s.

== Function ==
Debate exists as to what exactly the functions of these temples were, since they seem to have been for more than just royal funerary purposes, unlike Egyptian pyramids, but nevertheless seem to have been part of the cultic worship of kingship, since it was essential for each king to have a personal temple. According to the scholar Massimiliano Nuzzolo, during the V and VI Dynasties, "The Pharaoh appears to have acquired a new socio-religious meaning as 'sun-king' and 'sun god'". This correlates well with the fact that these sun temples are the first found instances of Egyptian monarchs dedicating large structures made from stone entirely separate from funerary pyramids.

== Importance and different temples ==
The location of the sun temples of Userkaf and Nyuserre Ini at Abu Gorab and Abusir.

Due to the fact that there are six to seven different names of sun temples mentioned in primary sources from this period, it is suggested there are at least six different temples. However, there is no specific term for sun temple in ancient Egyptian. The temples were also a source of great wealth and importance in ancient Egypt.

The founder of the Fifth Dynasty, Userkaf, built the first temple to Ra in Abusir, a few kilometres north of the necropolis of Saqqara, where he had built his pyramid. In total, the following temples were built:

- Nekhenre, "The fortress of Re", built by Userkaf
- Sekhetre, "The field of Re", built by Sahure
- Setibre, "The favourite place of Re", built by Neferirkare Kakai
- Hetepre, "The offering place of Re", built by Neferefre
- Conjectural: Hotepibre, "Satisfied is the heart of Re", started by Shepseskare
- Shesepibre "Joy of the heart of Re", built by Nyuserre Ini
- Akhetre, "The horizon of Re", built by Menkauhor Kaiu.

Only the solar temples of Userkaf and Nyuserre have been discovered to date. Nyuserre's temple contains a large catalogue of inscriptions and reliefs from this king's reign.

== Structure ==
The sun temples were built on the west bank of the Nile and like pyramids had one way in and one way out. Each sun temple seems to have had three main sections: first, there appears to have been a small valley temple near a canal or cultivation site; second, a short causeway led up to the desert from the small valley temple; on the desert plateau stood the third and most important part, the sun temple proper.
