= Eberhard Otto (Egyptologist) =

German Egyptologist (1913–1974)

Eberhard Otto (26 February 1913, Dresden – 11 October 1974 Heidelberg) was a German Egyptologist.

Otto studied from 1932 to 1937 in Leipzig, Munich and Göttingen and after his Promotion in 1938 and his Habilitation in 1943 was appointed in 1950 unofficial professor extraordinarius of Egyptology at the University of Hamburg. In 1955 he was appointed professor ordinarius of Egyptology at the University of Heidelberg. He was known for his work on the religion and art of ancient Egypt and, in particular, his role as co-editor, with Wolfgang Helck, of the first volume of the multi-volume Lexikon der Ägyptologie. After his death his successor as co-editor for volumes 2 through 7 was Wolfhart Westendorf. Otto's most commercially successful book was the paperback book dedicated to his wife and entitled Ägypten. Der Weg des Pharaonenreiches (Egypt: The Way of the Pharaonic Kingdom). The book was first published in 1953 and had five editions through 1979 with a reprint of the 1979 fifth edition in 2010.

In 1957 he became a full member of the Heidelberger Akademie der Wissenschaften.

== Selected works ==
- Beiträge zur Geschichte der Stierkulte in Aegypten. Leipzig 1938.
- Das Verhältnis von Rite und Mythus im Ägyptischen. Heidelberg 1938 (Sitzungsberichte der Heidelberger Akademie der Wissenschaften).
- Der Vorwurf an Gott - Zur Entstehung der ägyptischen Auseinandersetzungsliteratur. Hildesheim 1951.
- Topographie des thebanischen Gaues, Berlin/Leipzig 1952.
- Die biographischen Inschriften der ägyptischen Spätzeit - ihre geistesgeschichtliche und literarische Bedeutung. Brill, Leiden 1954.
- Kleines Wörterbuch der Ägyptologie. 1956 (with Wolfgang Helck).
- Das ägyptische Mundöffnungsritual. Teil 1: Text; Teil 2: Kommentar. Wiesbaden 1960.
- Gott und Mensch nach den ägyptischen Tempelinschriften der griechisch-römischen Zeit. Heidelberg 1964.
- Osiris und Amun. Kult und heilige Stätten. Hirmer, München 1966 (with Max Hirmer).
- Ägypten. Architektur, Plastik, Malerei in drei Jahrtausenden. 4. neu bearbeitete und sehr erweiterte Auflage, München 1967 (with Max Hirmer, Kurt Lange and Christiane Desroches-Noblecourt).
  - 2-bändige Taschenbuchausgabe: Ägyptische Kunst. dtv Wissenschaftliche Reihe, München 1971, ISBN 3-423-04092-0 und ISBN 3-423-04093-9.
- Wesen und Wandel der ägyptischen Kultur. 1969.
- Wesen und Wandel der ägyptischen Kultur. Berlin 1969.
- Lexikon der Ägyptologie. 1971ff. (ed. with Wolfgang Helck).
- Ägypten. Der Weg des Pharaonenreiches. Nachdruck der 5. Auflage aus 1979, Kohlhammer, Stuttgart 2010 (?), ISBN 978-3-17-005160-7.
