= Friedrich Wilhelm von Bissing =

German Egyptologist (1873–1956)

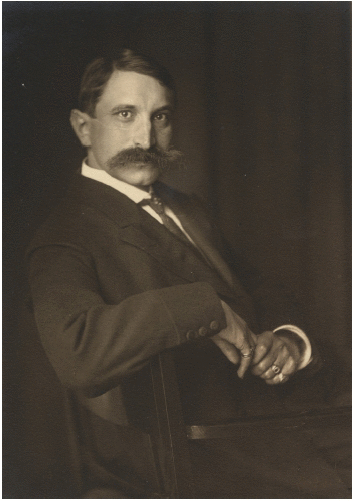
Prof. Dr. phil. Friedrich Wilhelm von Bissing; photograph by Theodor Hilsdorf

Friedrich Wilhelm Freiherr von Bissing (b. 22 April 1873 in Potsdam, Province of Brandenburg, Kingdom of Prussia, German Empire; d. 12 January 1956 in Oberaudorf am Inn, Bavaria, West Germany), also Friedrich Wilhelm Graf von Bissingen und Nippenburg, or Baron von Bissingen, was a German Egyptologist.

== Life ==
Friedrich was the son of Prussian general Moritz Ferdinand von Bissing (1844–1917) and his first wife Myrrha, née Wesendonck (1851–1888).

He studied classical philology, archaeology, Egyptology and art history in Bonn and Berlin, obtaining his doctorate in 1896 with the thesis "De tabula quam dicunt statistica Tuthmosis III commentatio(Commentary on the record of the statistics of Tuthmosis III)". After graduation, he spent considerable time in Egypt, performing museum and excavatory work. He was instrumental towards the development of the "General catalog" of the Cairo Museum (Catalogue général des antiquités Egyptiennes du Musée du Caire), and with Ludwig Borchardt, conducted an archaeological excavation of the Sun Temple of Nyuserre Ini at Abu Gurab.

In 1900, he received his habilitation at the Ludwig-Maximilians-Universität München, where he later attained the posts of associate professor (1905) and full professor (1906). From 1922 until his retirement in 1926, he served as a professor at Utrecht University. For the last 30 years of his life he worked as a private scholar in the town of Oberaudorf am Inn.

=== Political views and personal life ===
Bissing was considered politically reactionary, he was accused of ethnic, anti-Semitic and anti-Catholic attitudes. He joined the NSDAP on September 16, 1925 (membership number 18,729) and was a friend of Rudolf Hess. He wore the Golden Party Badge. He remained a devout Protestant and was even a member of the state synod of the Evangelical Lutheran Church in Bavaria. He failed in his efforts to remain loyal to the party and the church at the same time. In 1937, despite an appeal for clemency to the Fuhrer, he was expelled from the party. Before 1945, however, he did not turn away from Nazism. However, he could not come to terms with individual excesses of the Nazis. After the so-called "Reichspogromnacht" in 1938, he visited his Jewish colleague Georg Steindorff to express his regret about what had happened.

Friedrich Wilhelm von Bissing had been married to Elisabeth "Elsa" Margarethe Karoline Freifrau von Carlowitz (1875–1961) since 6 October 1904. Their daughter and only child was Myrrha Margarethe Irma Alice (1908–2002).

== Selected works ==
- Das Re-heiligtum des Königs Ne-woser-re (Rathures), 1905 (with Ludwig Borchardt).
- Denkmäler ägyptischer Skulptur, 1911.
- Die Kultur des alten Ägyptens, 1913.
- Agyptische Kultbilder der Ptolomaier- und Römerzeit, 1936.
