= Steindorff Egyptian Collection =

Collection of antiquities assembled by Georg Steindorff

The Steindorff Egyptian Collection is a collection of 163 antiquities assembled by the German Egyptologist Georg Steindorff and held at the Egyptian Museum of the Leipzig University in Germany. It includes Egyptian objects, Greek and Roman antiquities, and early Islamic ceramics. Steindorff sold his private collection to Leipzig University in 1937, during the Nazi period. The circumstances of the sale became the subject of a restitution dispute between the university and the Claims Conference. Following an administrative decision in 2009 and a court ruling in May 2011, the parties reached an agreement allowing the collection to remain at the university.

== Formation and contents ==
Steindorff expanded Leipzig University's Egyptian collection through purchases and archaeological work. Alongside these institutional activities, he assembled a private collection used for teaching. The private collection was distinct from the university museum's wider holdings. The 163 objects include a Naqada bowl, clay figures, early Islamic ceramics, and Greek and Roman antiquities.

== Sale during Nazi rule ==
Steindorff, who was of Jewish origin, sold his private collection to Leipzig University in 1937 for 8,000 Reichsmarks. He had previously valued the individual objects at a total of 10,260 Reichsmarks. He emigrated to the United States in 1939. The circumstances of the transaction later became disputed. The Claims Conference maintained that the sale resulted from Nazi persecution, while the university argued that it had been voluntary.

== Restitution proceedings ==
=== Claims Conference application ===
In 1995, the Claims Conference sought restitution of the collection as Steindorff's legal successor. In 2009, the Federal Office for Central Services and Unresolved Property Issues approved its application. Leipzig University challenged the decision. Steindorff's grandson, Thomas Hemer, opposed transferring the collection to the Claims Conference. He argued that the objects should remain at the university to preserve his grandfather's academic legacy and appeared as a witness in the proceedings.

=== Court ruling ===
On 26 May 2011, the Berlin Administrative Court dismissed the university's challenge to the restitution decision. The court applied the legal presumption that sales by people subjected to Nazi persecution were persecution related. The university had not established that the sale was unaffected by persecution.

=== Settlement ===
On 22 June 2011, representatives of the Claims Conference and Leipzig University reached an agreement in Berlin. The collection would remain university property, without a payment to the Claims Conference. The university acknowledged the persecution-related loss of the collection and agreed to document and publicise Steindorff's life and treatment under National Socialism. It also agreed not to continue the litigation. The agreement accorded with Hemer's wish that the collection remain in Leipzig. Roman Haller, representing the Claims Conference, emphasised the importance of recognising persecution-related losses and establishing transparency about how museums acquired their holdings.

== Egyptian restitution demand ==
In May 2011, Egyptian antiquities minister Zahi Hawass demanded that the Claims Conference return the collection to Egypt and threatened legal proceedings. The demand concerned the objects' earlier removal from Egypt, separately from the dispute over Steindorff's sale during the Nazi period. The June 2011 agreement provided for the collection to remain in Leipzig.

== Commemoration ==
In April 2012, Leipzig University announced a commemorative plaque and a special exhibition honouring Steindorff. These measures followed its commitment under the settlement to investigate and communicate his persecution and the history of his collection.
