= Wolfgang Helck =

German Egyptologist (1914–1993)

Hans Wolfgang Helck (16 September 1914 – 27 August 1993) was a German Egyptologist, considered one of the most important Egyptologists of the 20th century. From 1956 until his retirement in 1979 he was a professor at the University of Hamburg. He remained active after his retirement and together with Wolfhart Westendorf published the German Lexikon der Ägyptologie (Encyclopedia of Egyptology), completed in 1992. He published many books and articles on the history of Egyptian and Near Eastern culture. He was a member of the German Archaeological Institute and a corresponding member of the Göttingen Academy of Sciences.

Helck was the son of philologist Hans Helck. He studied at the University of Leipzig under Georg Steindorff and at the University of Göttingen under Hermann Kees, completing his studies in 1938. He was a prisoner of war during World War II, returning to Göttingen in 1947, completing his doctorate in 1951.

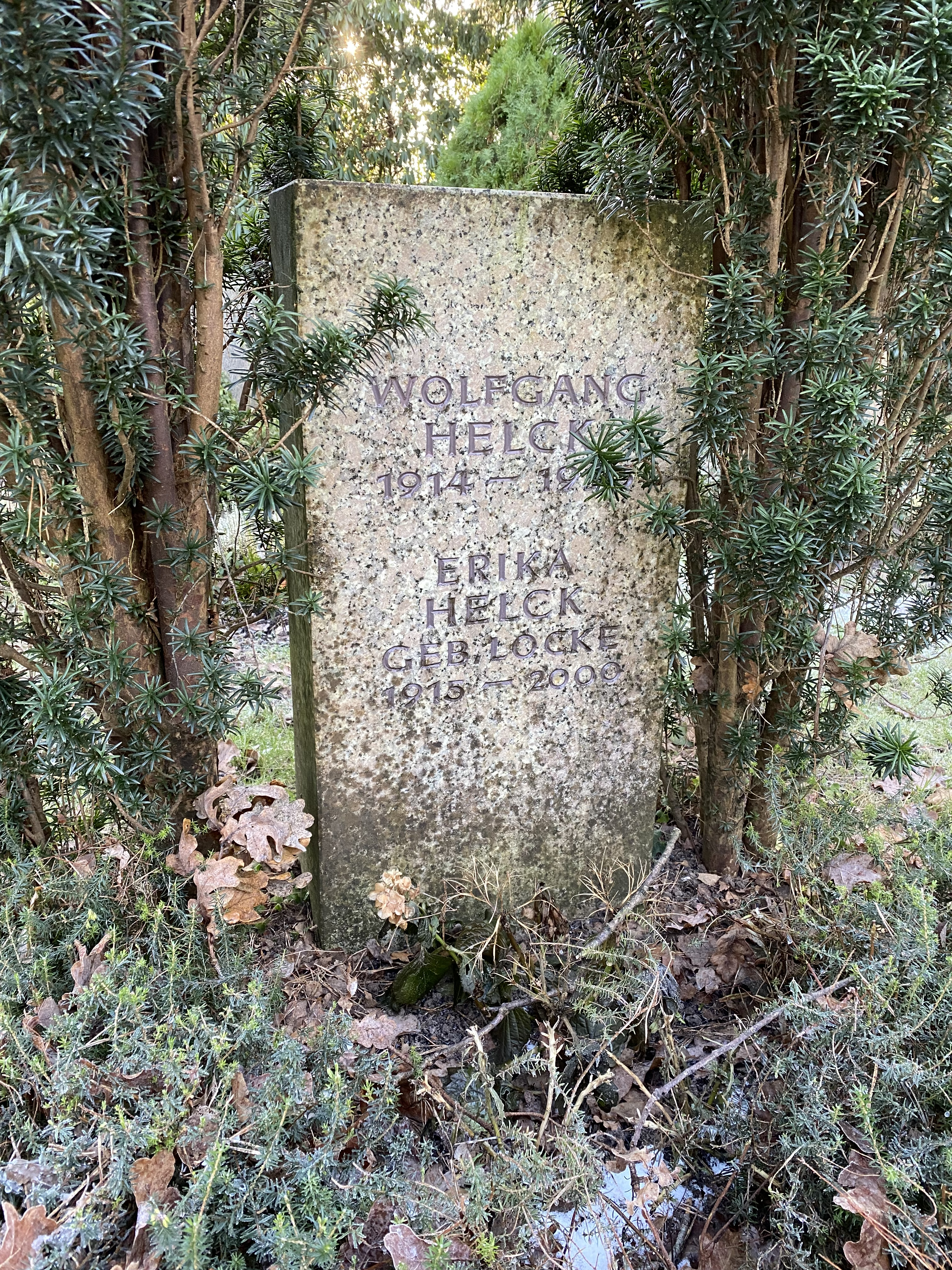
Gravestone of Wolfgang Helck

== Publications ==
- Der Einfluß der Militärführer in der 18. ägyptischen Dynastie (= Untersuchungen zur Geschichte und Altertumskunde Ägyptens Bd. 14). Leipzig 1939.
- Untersuchungen zu den Beamtentiteln des ägyptischen Alten Reiches (= Ägyptologische Forschungen. Nr. 18). Augustin, Glückstadt/Hamburg/New York 1954.
- Urkunden der 18. Dynastie Heft 17 Urkunden der 18. Dynastie Heft 18 Urkunden der 18. Dynastie Heft 19 Urkunden der 18. Dynastie Heft 20, Urkunden der 18. Dynastie Heft 21.Urkunden der 18. Dynastie Heft 22 Heft 17–22, Akademie Verlag, Berlin 1955–1958.
- Kleines Lexikon der Ägyptologie. Harrassowitz, Wiesbaden 1956 (zusammen mit Eberhard Otto).
- Untersuchungen zu Manetho und den ägyptischen Königslisten (= Untersuchungen zur Geschichte und Altertumskunde Ägyptens. Bd. 18). Berlin 1956.
- Zur Verwaltung des Mittleren und Neuen Reichs (= Probleme der Ägyptologie. Bd. 3). Brill, Leiden 1958.
- Materialien zur Wirtschaftsgeschichte des Neuen Reiches (= Abhandlungen der geistes- und sozialwissenschaftlichen Klasse der Akademie der Wissenschaften und der Literatur in Mainz. Jahrgang 1960, Nr. 10–11, Jahrgang 1963, Nr. 2–3, Jahrgang 1964, Nr. 4, [...]). Harrassowitz, Wiesbaden 1960–1969.
- Urkunden der 18. Dynastie. Übersetzung zu den Heften 17–22, Berlin 1961.
- Die Beziehungen Ägyptens zu Vorderasien im 3. und 2. Jahrtausend v. Chr. In: Ägyptologische Abhandlungen (ÄA). Band 5, Harrassowitz, Wiesbaden 1962.
  - 2., verbesserte Auflage. Harrassowitz, Wiesbaden 1971.
- Geschichte des Alten Ägypten. In: Handbuch der Orientalistik. Erste Abteilung, Erster Band, Dritter Abschnitt, Brill, Leiden/Köln 1968.
  - 2. Auflage. Brill, Leiden/Köln 1981, ISBN 90-04-06497-4.
- Jagd und Wild im alten Vorderasien. Die Jagd in der Kunst, Hamburg, Berlin 1968.
- Die Ritualszenen auf der Umfassungsmauer Ramses' II. in Karnak. In: Ägyptologische Abhandlungen. Band 18, Harrassowitz, Wiesbaden 1968.
- Der Text der „Lehre Amenemhets I. für seinen Sohn“. In: Kleine ägyptische Texte (KÄT). Harrassowitz, Wiesbaden 1969.
- Die Lehre des Dw3-Htjj. Teil 1 und 2. In: KÄT. Harrassowitz, Wiesbaden 1970.
- Die Prophezeiung des Nfr.tj (=Nefeferti). In: KÄT. Harrassowitz, Wiesbaden 1970.
- Betrachtungen zur Großen Göttin und den ihr verbundenen Gottheiten (= Religion und Kultur der alten Mittelmeerwelt in Parallelforschungen. Bd. 2). München/Wien 1971.
- Das Bier im Alten Ägypten. Berlin 1971.
- Die Ritualdarstellungen des Ramesseums. Teil I (= Ägyptologische Abhandlungen (ÄA). Bd. 25). Harrassowitz, Wiesbaden 1972.
- Der Text des Nilhymnus. In: KÄT. Harrassowitz, Wiesbaden 1972.
- Altägyptische Aktenkunde des 3. und 2. Jahrtausends v. Chr. (= Münchener Ägyptologische Studien. Band 31). München/Berlin 1974.
- Die Altägyptischen Gaue. (= Beihefte Tübinger Atlas des Vorderen Orients. Reihe B (Geisteswissenschaften), Nr. 5), Wiesbaden 1974.
- Historisch-biographische Texte der 2. Zwischenzeit und neue Texte der 18. Dynastie. In: KÄT. Harrassowitz, Wiesbaden 1975.
- Wirtschaftsgeschichte des Alten Ägypten im 3. und 2. Jahrtausend v. Chr. (= HDO. 1. Abt., 1. Band, 5. Abschnitt). Leiden/Köln 1975.
- Die Lehre für König Merikare. In: KÄT. Harrassowitz, Wiesbaden 1977.
- Die Beziehungen Ägyptens und Vorderasiens zur Ägäis bis ins 7. Jahrhundert v. Chr. (= Erträge der Forschung. Bd. 120). Wissenschaftliche Buchgesellschaft, Darmstadt 1979.
- Lehre des Hordjedef und Lehre eines Vaters an seinen Sohn. In: KÄT. Harrassowitz, Wiesbaden 1984.
- Gedanken zum Ursprung der ägyptischen Schrift. In: Mélanges Gamal Eddin Mokhtar: Bulletin de l'Institut Français d'Archéologie. Kairo 1985.
- Politische Gegensätze im alten Ägypten (= Hildesheimer ägyptologische Beiträge. Bd. 23). Gerstenberg, Hildesheim, 1986.
- Untersuchungen zur Thinitenzeit (= Ägyptologische Abhandlungen. Bd. 45). Harrassowitz, Wiesbaden 1987, ISBN 3-447-02677-4 (eingeschränkte Onlineversion)
- Tempel und Kult. Harrassowitz, Wiesbaden 1987, ISBN 3-447-02693-6.
- Thinitische Topfmarken. Harrassowitz, Wiesbaden 1990, ISBN 3-447-02982-X.
- Das Grab Nr. 55 im Königsgräbertal, Sein Inhalt und seine historische Bedeutung (= Sonderschrift des Deutschen Archäologischen Instituts 29). von Zabern, Mainz 2001.
- Die datierten und datierbaren Ostraka, Papyri und Graffiti von Deir el Medineh. Harrassowitz, Wiesbaden 2002.
- Untersuchungen zur Thinitenzeit (= Ägyptologische Abhandlungen. Bd. 45). Harrassowitz, Wiesbaden 1987, ISBN 3-447-02677-4.
- Discussing the Chronology of the New Kingdom, Journal of the Ancient Chronology Forum (JACF) 7, 1995, pp. 79–84 PDF

Editor and jointly authored

- Probleme der Ägyptologie. Brill, Leiden 1953 ff.
- Ägyptologische Abhandlungen (ÄA). Harrassowitz, Wiesbaden 1960 ff.
- Kleine ägyptische Texte (KÄT). Harrassowitz, Wiesbaden 1969 ff.
- Lexikon der Ägyptologie. Band I–VII, Harrassowitz, Wiesbaden 1975–1992 (zusammen mit Wolfhart Westendorf, in der Vorbereitungsphase auch Eberhard Otto).

== Literature ==
- Festschrift Wolfgang Helck zu seinem 70. Geburtstag. Buske, Hamburg 1984, ISBN 3-87118-688-0 (S. 3–34 Schriftenverzeichnis).
- Elke Blumenthal, Erik Hornung: Wolfgang Helck. 16. September 1914–27. August 1993. In: Zeitschrift für Ägyptische Sprache und Altertumskunde. Band 121, 1994, S. VII-IX.
- Warren R. Dawson, Eric P. Uphill, Maurice L. Bierbrier: Who was who in Egyptology. 3., überarbeitete Auflage. The Egypt Exploration Society, London 1995, ISBN 0-85698-125-7, S. 198.
- Hartwig Altenmüller: Helck, Wolfgang. In: Peter Kuhlmann, Helmuth Schneider (Hrsg.): Geschichte der Altertumswissenschaften. Biographisches Lexikon (= Der Neue Pauly. Supplemente. Band 6). Metzler, Stuttgart/Weimar 2012, ISBN 978-3-476-02033-8, Sp. 554–556.
