= Eberhard Otto (politician) =

German politician (1948–2023)

Member of the Bundestag
- In office 17 October 2002 – 18 October 2005

Personal details
- Born: 14 June 1948 Lübstorf, Mecklenburg-Vorpommern, Germany
- Died: 7 September 2023 (aged 75)
- Party: FDP
- Occupation: Entrepreneur

Eberhard Otto (14 June 1948 – 7 September 2023) was a German entrepreneur and politician. A member of the Free Democratic Party, he served in the Bundestag from 2002 to 2005.

Otto died on 7 September 2023, at the age of 75.
