= Herbert Ricke =

German archaeologist, Egyptologist and historian (1901–1976)

- Born: 27 September 1901; Linden, Hannover
- Died: 22 March 1976 (aged 74); Dießen am Ammersee
- Occupation: Egyptologist

Herbert Rüdiger Ricke (27 September 1901 – 22 March 1976), was a German archaeologist, Egyptologist and architectural historian who is best known for his works on ancient Egyptian architecture.

== Biography ==
H. Ricke studied architecture from 1920 to 1925 at Leibniz University Hannover where he was influenced by the Bauhaus. After obtaining his Diplom in 1925, he worked in Egypt from 1926 to 1928 under the direction of Ludwig Borchardt on the publication of excavations undertaken at Tel al-Amarna by the Deutsche Orient-Gesellschaft (German oriental society), which had been interrupted by the first world war. Thanks to his work Der Grundriss des Amarna-Wohnhauses (The plan of dwellings at Amarna), he received his doctorate under the supervision of Uvo Hölscher at Leibniz University Hannover. He then returned as an employee of Borchardt in Egypt, in Borchardt's Institute, now known as the Swiss research institute on Egyptian architecture and archaeology in Cairo. He undertook excavations in western Thebes from 1934 to 1937 and in Karnak and Elephantine in 1938.

The outbreak of the second world war surprised him while he was in Switzerland and prevented his return to Egypt. H. Ricke thus worked at the institute headquarters in Zurich during the war. He resumed work in Egypt after the war and from 1944 until 1950 published his most important work Bemerkungen zur ägypt. Baukunst des Alten Reichs (Remarks on the Egyptian architecture of the Old Kingdom). From 1950 onwards he led the institute as a research expert together with its executive director Dr. Étienne Combe. They placed the institute under the patronage of the Swiss Embassy in Cairo and consequently had it renamed Schweizerische Institut für Ägyptische Bauforschung und Altertumskunde in Kairo. At the time he worked on excavations and architectural history studies at Karnak (1952–54), Dahshur (1951–1955), Abusir (1954–57) where he excavated the Sun temple of Userkaf, and Elephantine (1954, 1958). In 1957 he became the scientific director of the institute and worked in Khor-Dehmit and Beit el-Wali (1960–61), Giza (1965–67) and again in Thebes (1964 and 1970). H. Ricke finally became the executive director of the institute in 1962, a position he held until his retirement in 1970. He retired in Dießen am Ammersee (Upper Bavaria) where he died 6 years later.

== Honors ==
In 1953 H. Ricke was elected corresponding member of the German Archaeological Institute. He became an honorary member of the Egyptology Institute of Charles University, Prague (1963), Member of the Academy of Sciences in Göttingen (since 1965) and the Institut d'Egypte (1968).

== Works ==
- B. Peyer: Beiträge zur Ägyptischen Bauforschung und Altertumskunde. Band 12, 1971, p. XIII.
- Morris J. Bierbrier: Who was who in Egyptology. London 1995, p. 357.
