= Sun Temple of Userkaf =

Ancient Egyptian temple dedicated to the sun god Ra built by pharaoh Userkaf

Coordinates: 29.900063°N 31.199134°E

Sun temple of Userkaf (Arabic: معبد الشمس في أوسركاف) in hieroglyphs
N5 O48 O25.
nḫn-Rˁ
Nekhen-Ra

The Sun Temple of Userkaf (Nekhen-Re) was an ancient Egyptian temple dedicated to the sun god Ra built by Pharaoh Userkaf, the founder of the Fifth Dynasty of Egypt, at the beginning of the 25th century BCE. The sun temple of Userkaf lies between the Abusir pyramid field to the south and the locality of Abu Gorab to the north, some 15 km (9.3 mi) south of modern-day Cairo. The ancient name of the temple was Nekhen-Re meaning the "Stronghold of Ra". The temple complex comprised several parts: on a low hill situated on the desert edge was the main temple which could be accessed via a causeway from a valley temple, located nearer to the area of cultivation and the Nile.

== Excavations ==
The sun temple of Userkaf was discovered by Karl Richard Lepsius in 1842, then director of the Prussian expedition to Egypt. Lepsius did not recognise the sun temple as such and rather included it in his pioneering list of pyramids, under the number XVII. Lepsius only investigated the monument superficially and the first excavations of the temple took place much later, in 1907 and 1913, under the direction of Ludwig Borchardt. Borchardt's main work however was on the nearby royal cemetery at Abusir. The temple was the focus of a dedicated excavation only 40 years later, between in 1954 to 1957, this time under the impulse of the German-Swiss expedition led by Herbert Ricke. The results were published in two volumes.

== Temple layout ==
Plan of the sun temple of Userkaf

The temple was found heavily destroyed so that any reconstruction remains very problematic. The main temple consisted originally of one big solid mastaba–like structure with a mast on top. This can be guessed from references in texts where the temple is depicted as mastaba with a mast. It was surrounded by a wall, and two offering chapels were placed in front of this main structure. They each had only one room. In a later phase, the main structure received an obelisk–shaped top. An altar was added in front of the building. The temple was most likely erected in year 5 or 6 of the pharaoh's reign, as it is mentioned on the Palermo Stone (the remains of annals). The obelisk was most likely not added under Userkaf, but under one of his successors, perhaps under Pharaoh Neferirkare. The obelisk shape of the top can be concluded from the writing of the temple name in Old Kingdom texts. From the reign of the latter pharaoh on, the name is always written with an obelisk. Furthermore, there are firm archaeological reasons for the obelisk. One corner piece from the top edge of the obelisk was found, made of granite. Remains of at least two statue shrines were found. They were made of greywacke and decorated with a pattern, imitating matting or wooden beams.

The valley temple was found heavily destroyed too. It had most likely an open court with pillars and several chapels at the back. The number of these chapels is unknown. In the debris of the temple was found a stone head of a pharaoh, most likely Pharaoh Userkaf. It is possible that the stone temple was not built under Userkaf, but later perhaps, under Niuserre. There were found building marks that are otherwise only attested for this pharaoh. Both temples were not decorated with any reliefs or inscriptions (at least nothing of this survived).

Many seal impressions were found. Most of them bear pharaoh's names. Pharaohs Userkaf, Sahure, Niuserre, Djedkare and Unas are attested, providing evidence that the temple was used at least until the end of the Fifth Dynasty. This is also confirmed by the pottery found. In contrast, the valley temple was in use until the end of the Sixth Dynasty, according to the pottery evidence. From the New Kingdom come several visitor inscriptions, one of them was made by the reporter of the pharaoh Iamunedjeh, a person well known from other sources. He lived under Thutmoses III, about 1,000 years after the building was erected. In his inscription, the temple is described as a pyramid (Egyptian: mr). Evidently, the obelisk had collapsed by the New Kingdom and the remains were interpreted as pyramid.

== Bibliography ==
- Bard, Kathryn (2015). An Introduction to the archaeology of ancient Egypt. John Wiley & Sons, Inc. ISBN 978-0-470-67336-2.
- Herbert Ricke: Das Sonnenheiligtum des Königs Userkaf, Band I, Der Bau (Beiträge zur ägyptschen Bauforschung und Altertumskunde, Heft 7), Kairo 1965
- Elmar Edel, Gerhard Haeny, Wolfgang Helck, Werner Kaiser, Peter Kaplony, Herbert Ricke, Siegried Schott: Das Sonnenheiligtum des Königs Userkaf, II, Die Funde, (Beiträge zur ägyptschen Bauforschung und Altertumskunde, Heft 8), Wiesbaden 1969
