= Georg Steindorff =

German Egyptologist (1861–1951)

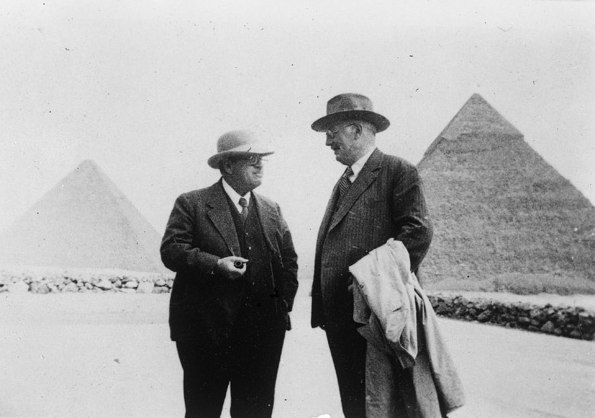
Georg Steindorff (right) with George Andrew Reisner (left) in Giza, Egypt (1935)

Georg Steindorff (November 12, 1861, Dessau – August 28, 1951, North Hollywood, California) was a German Egyptologist.

== Life ==
Georg Steindorff was a graduate of the Egyptology seminars of the University of Göttingen. He earned a doctorate in 1884 with a linguistic dissertation on Coptic noun forms. In 1893, the University of Leipzig appointed him to its chair for Egyptology, which had existed since 1870 and had previously been held by Georg Ebers. The Egyptian collection was founded by the archaeologist Gustav Seyffarth, but Steindorff built the small training collection that was left to him into a true museum. On his research trips to Egypt he acquired household and grave furnishings and also small-format artworks. He also brought larger finds from excavations back to Leipzig with him with the permission of the then French-run Antiquities Service. But these were mostly coming from the excavations organized by Steindorff in Egypt.

Of particular importance are Steindorff's excavations in Giza, Abusir, Qau, and Aniba between 1903 and 1931. The Egyptian Museum possesses many objects that were discovered on these expeditions. After his retirement in 1934, Steindorff lived another four years in Leipzig before emigrating to the United States in 1939, to avoid persecution as a Jew in Nazi Germany.

He was married to Elise Oppenheimer, sister of Franz Oppenheimer.

== Egyptian Collection ==
Steindorff assembled and collected a group of ancient Egyptian antiquities held at the Egyptian Museum of Leipzig University, Germany. The collection contains approximately 150 to 163 objects, including archaeological materials acquired through Steindorff's research and collecting activities in Egypt.

Steindorff sold his private collection to Leipzig University which was later contested as a persecution related loss of property. In 1990s, the conference on Jewish Material Claims against Germany sought restitution of the collection, and after a favorable administrative decision in 2009, and a court ruling in May 2011, the organization reached an agreement with Leipzig University that allowed the objects to remain at the university. This dispute attracted attention in Egypt where the antiquities minister Zahi Hawass called for the objects' repatriation in May 2011.

== Collection ownership and restitution dispute ==
=== Sale of the collection during Nazi rule ===
During his career at the Leipzig University, Georg Steindorff assembled a private collection of 163 ancient Egyptian objects, in addition to expanding the university's Egyptian Museum. His archaeological work included excavations in Giza, Abusir, Qau and Aniba, and objects from these excavations entered collections in Leipzig.

Following the Nazi seizure of power in Germany in 1933, Steindorff who was of Jewish descent, experienced increased professional restrictions and persecution. After his retirement in 1934, he sold his private collection of Egyptian antiquities to Leipzig University. The university paid 8,000 Reichsmarks for the collection which Steindorff had valued at 10,260 Reichsmarks. The circumstances of the sale became the subject of a restitution dispute as to whether the transaction had been made voluntarily or under pressure from Nazi persecution.

Steindorff emigrated to the United States in 1939, where he continued his Egyptological research.

=== Restitution proceedings ===
The conference on Jewish Material Claims against Germany, commonly known as the Claims Conference in the 1990s sought the restitution of Steindorff's private collections. The organization pursued the claim as a legal successor for property subject to Nazi-era dispossession. In 2009, the German federal Office for Central Services and Unresolved Property Issues ruled in favor of its restitution application. Leipzig University challenged the decision, arguing for the preservation of the collection as an important resource for Egyptological teaching and research.

Steindorff's grandson, Thomas Hemer also opposed the proposed removal of the objects, maintaining that his grandfather had wanted the collection to remain at the university, where he had spent much of his academic career.

On 26th May 2011, the Administrative Court of berlin dismissed Leipzig University's challenge to the restitution decision, prospecting that the university would have to surrender the disputed objects to the Claims Conference.

=== Egyptian restitution demands ===
The proceedings also prompted demands from Egypt concerning the antiquities original removal from Egyptian territory. In May 2011, Egyptian Minister of State for Antiquities Zahi Hawass called for the return of the objects and questioned the legitimacy of their acquisition during the earlier archeological expeditions.

Hawass reportedly sent a letter to the Claims conference demanding restitution and raised the possibility of legal proceedings if the objects wee not returned to Egypt.

=== Settlement and continued display in Leipzig ===
On 22nd June 2011, Leipzig university and the Claims Conference reached an agreement allowing Steindorff's private Egyptian collection to remain at the university. The collection continued to be housed at the Egyptian Museum-Georg Steindorff, which has occupied the Kroch Tower in Leipzig since 2010.
