= Wolfhart Westendorf =

German Egyptologist (1924–2018)

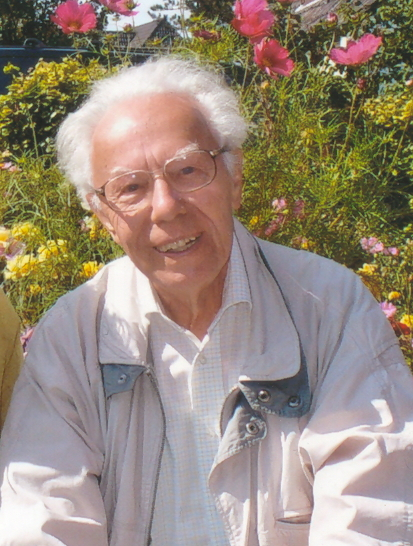
Wolfhart Westendorf

Wolfhart Westendorf (18 September 1924 – 23 February 2018) was a German Egyptologist. He was a student of Hermann Grapow, and with him, was a co-author of the Grundriss der Medizin der alten Ägypter (Plan of Medicine of the Ancient Egyptians), the most extensive study of the subject of ancient Egyptian medicine done in any language. As a supplement, he later published a handbook on the subject which appeared in 1998 as Handbuch der altägyptischen Medizin (Handbook of Ancient Egyptian Medicine) in the series Handbook of Oriental Studies. He has also published many other books on Egyptology and the ancient Egyptian language, as well as a dictionary of Coptic.

In the 1950s, Westendorf reportedly studied some of the unpublished notes from Howard Carter's excavation under the supervision of the Egyptian Antiquities Authority.
