= Abu Gorab =

Locality in Egypt

- Location within Egypt
- 29.903889°N 31.194167°E
- Location: Egypt
- Region: Cairo Governorate

Abu Gorab (Arabic: أبو غراب Egyptian Arabic pronunciation: [ˈæbu ɣoˈrɑb], also known as Abu Gurab, Abu Ghurab) is a locality in Egypt situated 15 km (9.3 mi) south of Cairo, between Saqqarah and Al-Jīzah (Giza), about 1 km (0.62 mi) north of Abusir, on the edge of the desert plateau on the western bank of the Nile. The locality is best known for the solar temple of King Nyuserre Ini, one of the best preserved solar temples of Ancient Egupt, as well as the solar temple of Userkaf, both built in the 25th century BCE during the Old Kingdom Period. Archaeological Evidence has been interpreted as indicating that as many as six solar temples were constructed during the 5th Dynasty, however, only the two temples previously mentioned (Nyussere's and Userkaf's) have been excavated. Abu Gorab is also the site of an Early Dynastic burial ground dating back to the First Dynasty.

== Early dynastic cemetery ==
North of Nyuserre's sun temple is a cemetery dating back to the First Dynasty of Egypt (c. 3100–2900 BCE), where people belonging to the middle ranks of the Ancient Egyptian society were buried. The area was primarily used as a burial site during the 5th dynasty and became nearly obsolete as a necropolis after the 5th dynasty.

== Sun temple of Nyuserre Ini ==
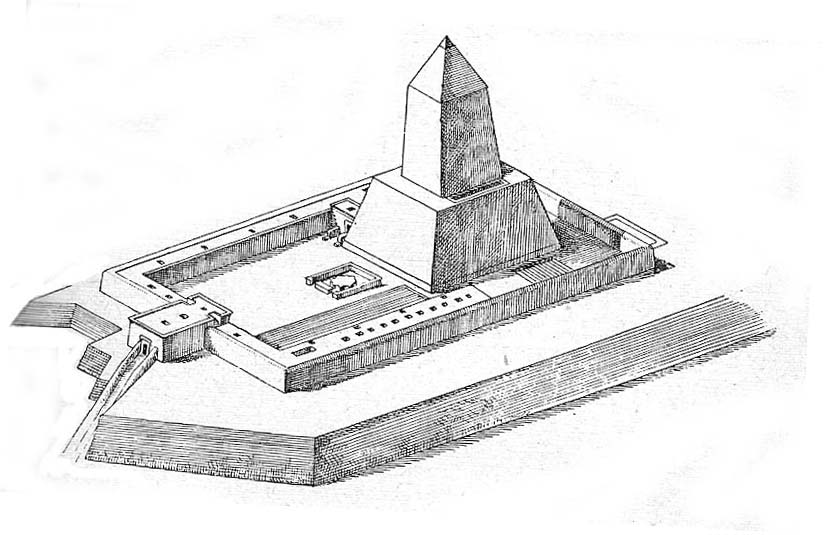
Reconstruction of Nyuserre's Sun Temple in Abu Gorab, by Gaston Maspero

The Sun Temple of Nyuserre was excavated by Egyptologists Ludwig Borchardt and Friedrich Willhelm von Bissing sometime between 1898 and 1901, on behalf of the Berlin Museum. The sun temple is situated near Memphis, and is closely linked with the Abusir necropolis, both geographically and functionally.

The temple was constructed on the orders of Nyuserre Ini, sixth king of the Fifth Dynasty of Egypt. The exact dates of his reign are unknown but it is estimated that he came to the throne early in the second half of the 25th century BCE. Nyuserre also built a pyramid complex in what was then the royal necropolis, 1 km (0.62 mi) to the south of Abu Gorab in Abusir. The temple was probably constructed late during Nyuserre's reign. It was built in honor of the Egyptian Sun god Ra and named (Ssp-ib-R’) meaning “Re’s Favorite Place” or "Joy of Re."

The temple consists of a rectangular walled enclosure, 100 by 76 meters with an entrance situated on the eastern face. The complex is primarily built out of mudbrick covered with limestone, and is situated on the shores of the ancient Abusir lake bed. The main temple was built on a natural hill that had been enhanced. Artificial terraces on this hill were created, which then served as the foundation for the temple. Entrance to the temple is gained through a small structure called the Valley Temple, on the eastern edge of the complex. It is partially submerged and has suffered extensive damage. It is known that an entrance corridor ran from the portico through the building and led to a causeway on the opposite side.

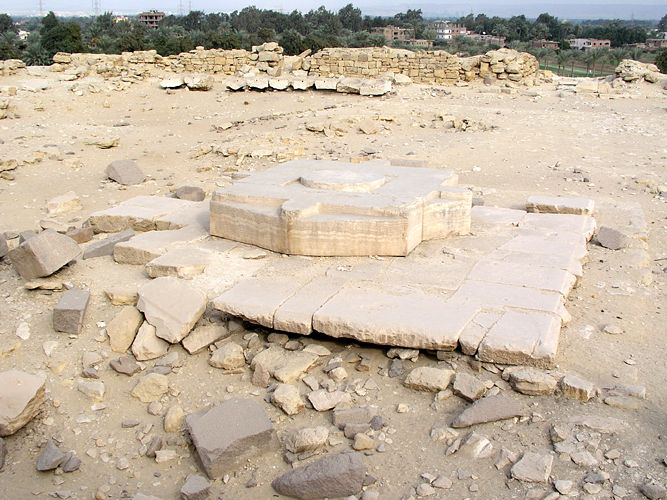
Altar at Solar Temple of Nyuserre

Inside the temple is a large, open courtyard. At the western end of the courtyard lie the ruins of a colossal stone obelisk. The obelisk had a pedestal red-granite base, sloping sides, and a square top. The obelisk itself, however, was constructed out of irregularly shaped limestone blocks. Estimates of the combined height of the obelisk and base vary, although the obelisk was most likely between thirty-five and fifty meters tall. An altar is located in the center of the courtyard, near the eastern face of the obelisk. It was constructed from five large blocks of alabaster, which are arranged to form a symbol that has been translated as "May Ra be satisfied". Records recovered from Userkaf's sun temple, suggest that two oxen and two geese were sacrificed each day. On the North side of the courtyard are the remains of several storerooms, which may have been where the sacrificial animals were slaughtered.

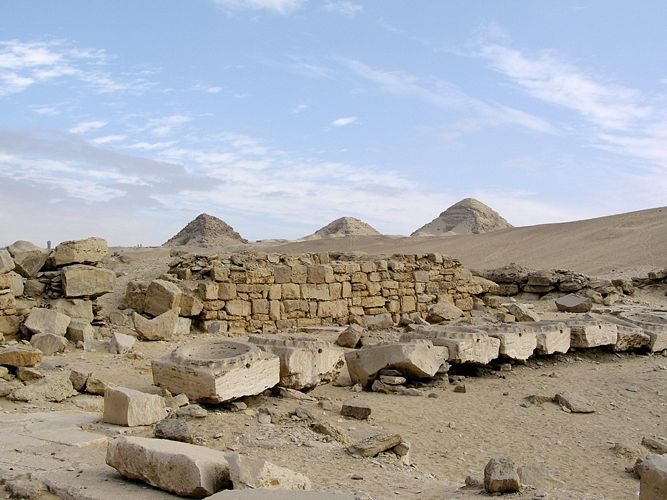
Stone Basins from the Solar Temple of Nyuserre

Along the east wall of the courtyard are a set of nine circular alabaster basins. It has been theorized that there were originally ten basins. Some scholars believe these basins were used to collect blood from animal sacrifice. To support this hypothesis, they point to evidence of grooves cut into the stone floor of the courtyard that may have been used to drain away the blood. Other researchers, however, think that the basins were probably only symbolic, or decorative, since no knives or other equipment related to sacrifice have been discovered in the area. It has also been hypothesized that these basins were used as leveling devices for large areas, linked together and filled with water to provide a common point of reference. Further examination, however, is required to determine the exact role of the alabaster bins.

A large, 30 x 10 m brick built sun barque buried in a mud-brick chamber was excavated to the south of the temple.

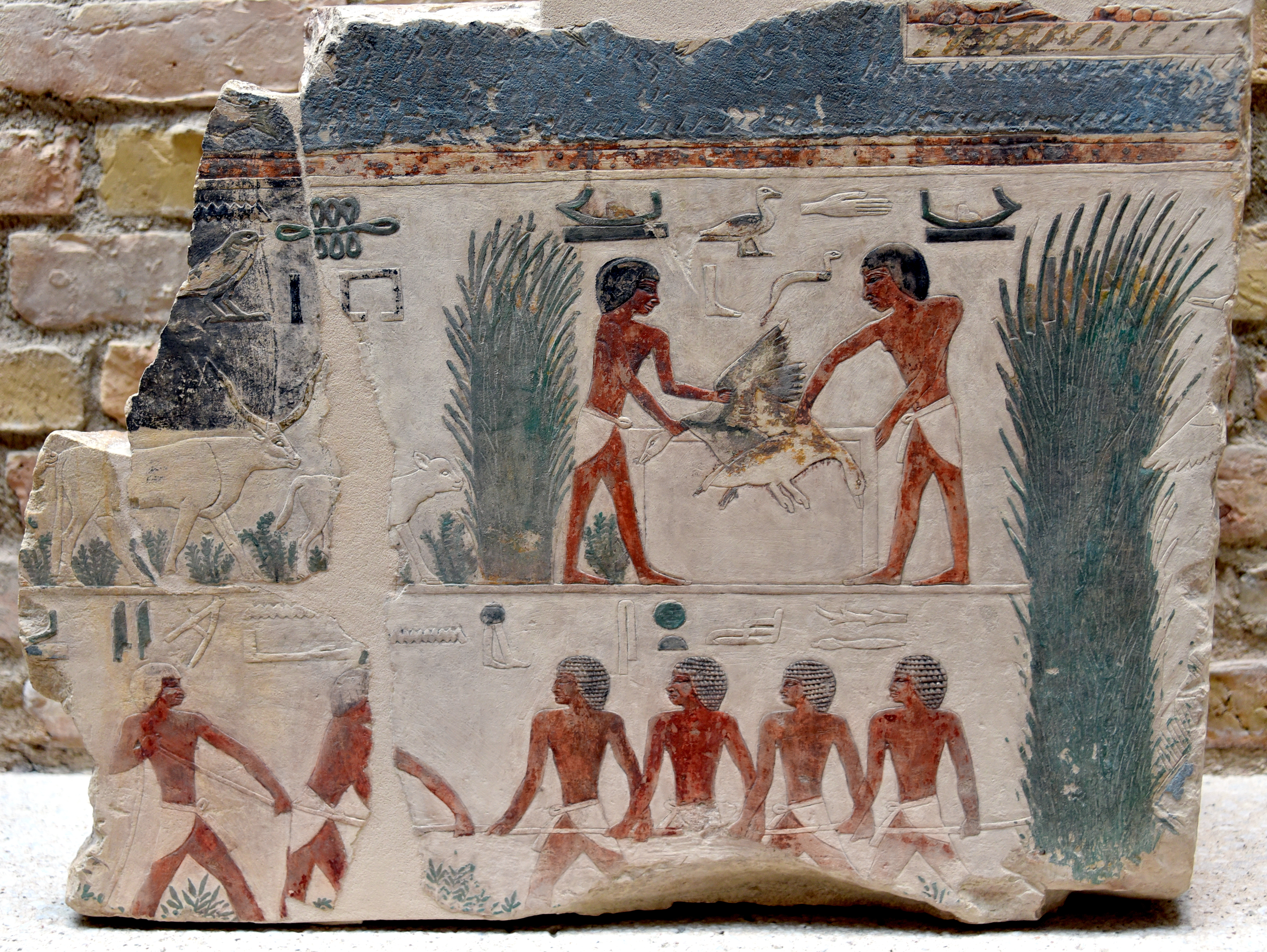
Fowling with a dragnet, agricultural scene, and handling ducks. Wall fragment from the Sun Temple of Nyuserre Ini at Abu Gorab, Egypt. c. 2430 BCE. Neues Museum, Berlin

In the covered corridor, on the east and southern edges of the temple, there were carved reliefs along the interior walls. The passageway was decorated with relief scenes depicting the sed-festival, an important Ancient Egyptian ritual of renewal. These carvings highlight Re's beneficent attitude towards Nyuserre's reign through episodes of the sed-festival. Such depictions, in fact, represent the most detailed display of this theme from the Old Kingdom. Similar sed-festival scenes also appear in the chapel towards the southern edge of the chapel. Additionally, in the short passageway connecting to the obelisk platform from the south, known as the Room of the Seasons, are detailed painted reliefs in limestone depicting two of the three Egyptian seasons, akhet (inundation) and shemu (harvest). The reliefs from the Room of the Seasons essentially illustrate the sun's life-giving and sustaining role in nature, particularly during the spring and summer seasons. Accompanying these seasonal scenes are illustrations of seasonal activities (i.e. netting fish, trapping birds, making papyrus boats, and phases of the agricultural cycle). The vast illustrations of animal and plant life as well as human engagement with nature may be some of the earliest extensive corpus of such scenes. The artwork was likely commissioned by King Nyuserre himself. Although, the reliefs do not reflect typical royal funerary decoration scene during The Old Kingdom, and although skilfully designed, they are not as carefully executed as similar carvings from the 4th and early 5th dynasties. The image to the right shows a fragmented relief from the temple. The carving portrays Egyptians trapping birds in a clap net. The clap net itself is missing, but six men are shown in the lower register holding the rope that will pull the net shut. In the upper right register, two figures are shown caging two birds that have already been caught, while in the upper left corner, a cow and her calf make up the remnants of a much larger animal husbandry scene. Nearly all reliefs at the site were removed, mostly to German collections, and many perished during World War II. Unfortunately as a result, today nearly all reliefs have been either destroyed or severely fragmented.

== Other ruins ==
The German archaeological expedition under the direction of Friedrich Wilhelm von Bissing uncovered the ruins of large buildings of mudbricks beneath the sun temple of Nyuserre in Abu Gorab. It is possible that these represent the remains of the sun temple of Neferefre, called Ra Hotep, "Ra's offering table", although this is still conjectural.

In August 2022, archaeologists from the Polish Academy of Sciences in Warsaw announced the discovery of a 4,500-year-old temple dedicated to the Egyptian sun god Ra. The recently discovered sun temple was made from mud bricks and was about 60 meters long by 20 m wide. According to Massimiliano Nuzzolo, co-director of the excavation, storage rooms and other rooms may have been served for cultic purposes and the walls of the building were all plastered in black and white. The L-shaped entrance portico had two limestone columns and was partly made of white limestone. Dozens of well-preserved beer jars and several well-made and red-lined vessels, seal impressions, including seals of the pharaohs who ruled during the fifth and sixth dynasties were also uncovered. One of the earliest seals might belonged to pharaoh Shepseskare, who ruled Egypt before Nyuserre.

== See also ==
- List of ancient Egyptian towns and cities

== Bibliography ==
- Goelet, Ogden (1999). "Abu Gurab". In Bard, Kathryn; Shubert, Stephen Blake (eds.). Encyclopedia of the archaeology of ancient Egypt. London; New York: Routledge. pp. 85–87. ISBN 978-0-203-98283-9.
- von Bissing, Friedrich Wilhelm; Borchardt, Ludwig; Kees, Hermann (1905). Das Re-Heiligtum des Königs Ne-Woser-Re (Rathures) (in German). OCLC 152524509.
- Verner, Miroslav; Zemina, Milan (1994). Forgotten pharaohs, lost pyramids: Abusir (PDF). Praha: Academia Škodaexport. ISBN 978-80-200-0022-4. Archived from the original (PDF) on 2011-02-01.
