= Unfinished Pyramid of Abusir =

Smooth-sided pyramid

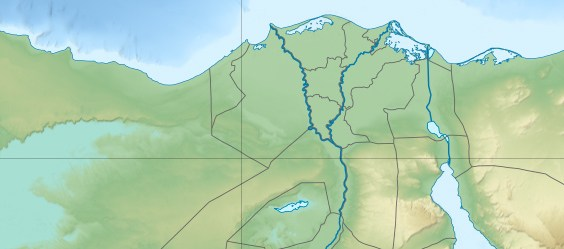
- Location within Lower Egypt
- 29°53′55″N 31°12′6″E
- Owner: Shepseskare (speculatively)
- Ancient name: Highly speculative: Rśỉ Špśś-kꜣ-rꜥ; Resi Shepseskare; "Shepseskare is in the South"
- Constructed: Fifth Dynasty
- Type: True
- Material: limestone (planned)
- Base: ~ 115 m (377 ft; 219 cu)

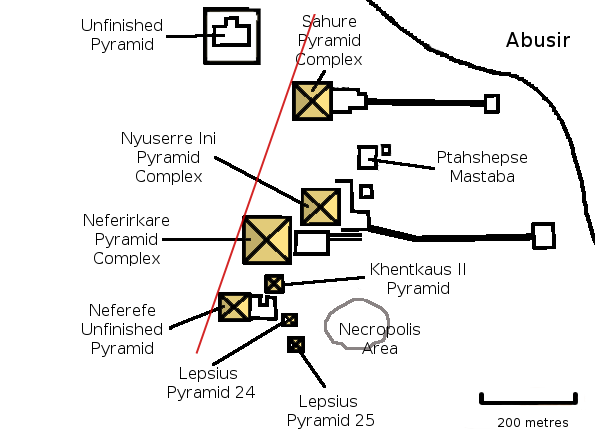
Necropolis of Abusir

The unfinished pyramid of Abusir is an abandoned pyramid complex located in the necropolis of Abusir whose construction began in the Fifth Dynasty. It is speculatively assigned to Shepseskare, an ephemeral pharaoh whose brief rule is the least well documented of the Fifth Dynasty.

== Exploration ==
The structure was discovered at the beginning of the 1980s by a Czech archaeological team led by Miroslav Verner, who noticed the levelled ground and the T-shaped burial trench. Relatively little is known about the structure. It is situated between the pyramid of Sahure and the sun temple of Userkaf, and thus probably post-dates their construction. It is evidently aligned astronomically. The project was abandoned after only a few weeks, as evidenced by the presence of incomplete preparatory work.

== Attribution and chronology ==
Deciphering the genealogy and chronology of the Fifth Dynasty has been a complex problem for historians due to the dearth and ambiguity of available historical sources. The chronological position and genealogy of Shepseskare, in particular, remains unclear.

The Saqqara King List and Manetho in Aegyptiaca list Shepseskare as a successor of Neferirkare, though the discovery of clay sealings in the Neferefre's mortuary temple suggest that he reigned after Neferefre. The development of the Abusir necropolis further supports this chronological re-arrangement: the pyramids of Sahure, Neferirkare, and Neferefre form a diagonal that links to Heliopolis, implying an order for those three rulers. Nyuserre too built his pyramid off the diagonal as well. To follow the Abusir-Heliopolis diagonal, the succeeding ruler would have needed to site the pyramid 1 km (0.62 mi) from the Nile valley, and thus deep into the desert. The cost for such a project was probably prohibitive.

The site has not been definitively attributed to any pharaoh, but has been tentatively assigned to Shepseskare on the basis that he is the sole viable candidate among the pharaohs of the Fifth Dynasty. Presuming this inferential assignment is correct, Verner suggests that Shepseskare may have been more closely related to Userkaf and Sahure, than to Neferirkare Kakai's bloodline. Verner has also been proposed that Shepseskare may be Netjerirenre, the eldest son of Sahure.

== Construction ==
When Shepseskare came to power, there were already three pyramids in the necropolis of Abusir. These were arranged with their northwest corners in a line, probably pointing to the obelisk of Heliopolis (the so-called "Abusir Diagonal"). To maintain this orientation, Shepseskare would have had to erect his pyramid even further into the desert than the unfinished Pyramid of Neferefre, which would have made the transport of materials difficult. Instead he chose an area northwest of the Pyramid of Sahure, halfway to the Sun temple of Userkaf, as his building site.

Shepseskare died after only a short reign, which led to the abandonment of construction. His successor Niuserre did not carry out any further work on this tomb. The location of Shepseskare's interment is unknown, but it is assumed that he was not buried in this barely started tomb.

== Pyramid ==
Construction of the actual pyramid structure was never begun. Only the levelling of the terrain to a flat, square area was carried out. In the middle of the levelled area is a T-shaped pit, in which the burial chamber and its entranceway would have been installed.

The dimensions of the levelled area and the pit allow it to be suggested that the building would have been a similar size to the Pyramid of Neferirkare (105 m x 105 m) and thus that it was planned to be the second largest tomb at Abusir, after the pyramid of Neferirkare. The actual dimensions are not recoverable, since stonework had not yet been installed. Additionally, the slope of the sides and thus the planned height is unknowable due to the lack of cladding stones.

Remains of a pyramid complex including the traditional elements of the mortuary temple, temenos wall, cult pyramid, causeway and valley temple were not found. These components were probably never begun, since they would have got in the way of the building work on the pyramid during the early stages of construction.

== See also ==
- List of Egyptian pyramids

== Bibliography ==
- Kaplony, Peter (1981). Die Rollsiegel des Alten Reiches. Katalog der Rollsiegel II. Allgemeiner Teil mit Studien zum Köningtum des Alten Reichs II. Katalog der Rollsiegel A. Text B. Tafeln (in German). Bruxelles: Fondation Egyptologique Reine Élisabeth. ISBN 978-0-583-00301-8.
- Verner, Miroslav (1982). "Eine zweite unvollendete Pyramide in Abusir". Zeitschrift für Ägyptische Sprache und Altertumskunde (in German). 109 (1): 75–78. doi:10.1524/zaes.1982.109.1.75. ISSN 2196-713X. S2CID 192970605.
- Verner, Miroslav (1994). Forgotten pharaohs, lost pyramids: Abusir (PDF). Prague: Academia Škodaexport. ISBN 978-80-200-0022-4. Archived from the original (PDF) on 2011-02-01.
- Verner, Miroslav (2000). "Who was Shepseskara, and when did he reign?". In Bárta, Miroslav; Krejčí, Jaromír (eds.). Abusir and Saqqara in the Year 2000 (PDF). Prague: Academy of Sciences of the Czech Republic, Oriental Institute. pp. 581–602. ISBN 978-80-85425-39-0. Archived from the original (PDF) on 2011-02-01.
- Verner, Miroslav (2001a). "Archaeological Remarks on the 4th and 5th Dynasty Chronology" (PDF). Archiv Orientální. 69 (3). Prague: 363–418. ISSN 0044-8699. Archived from the original (PDF) on 2016-03-04.
- Verner, Miroslav (2001b). The Pyramids: The Mystery, Culture and Science of Egypt's Great Monuments. New York: Grove Press. ISBN 978-0-8021-1703-8.
- Verner, Miroslav (2015). "The miraculous rise of the Fifth Dynasty – The story of Papyrus Westcar and historical evidence". Prague Egyptological Studies (XV): 86–92. ISSN 1214-3189.

General

- Stadelmann, Rainer (1997). Die ägyptischen Pyramiden. Vom Ziegelbau zum Weltwunder (in German) (3rd ed.). Mainz: von Zabern. p. 175. ISBN 3-8053-1142-7.
- Miroslav Verner. Die Pyramiden. Rowohlt, Reinbek 1998, ISBN 3499608901, pp. 345–346.
