= Sematawytefnakht =

Egyptian high priest in 330s BCE

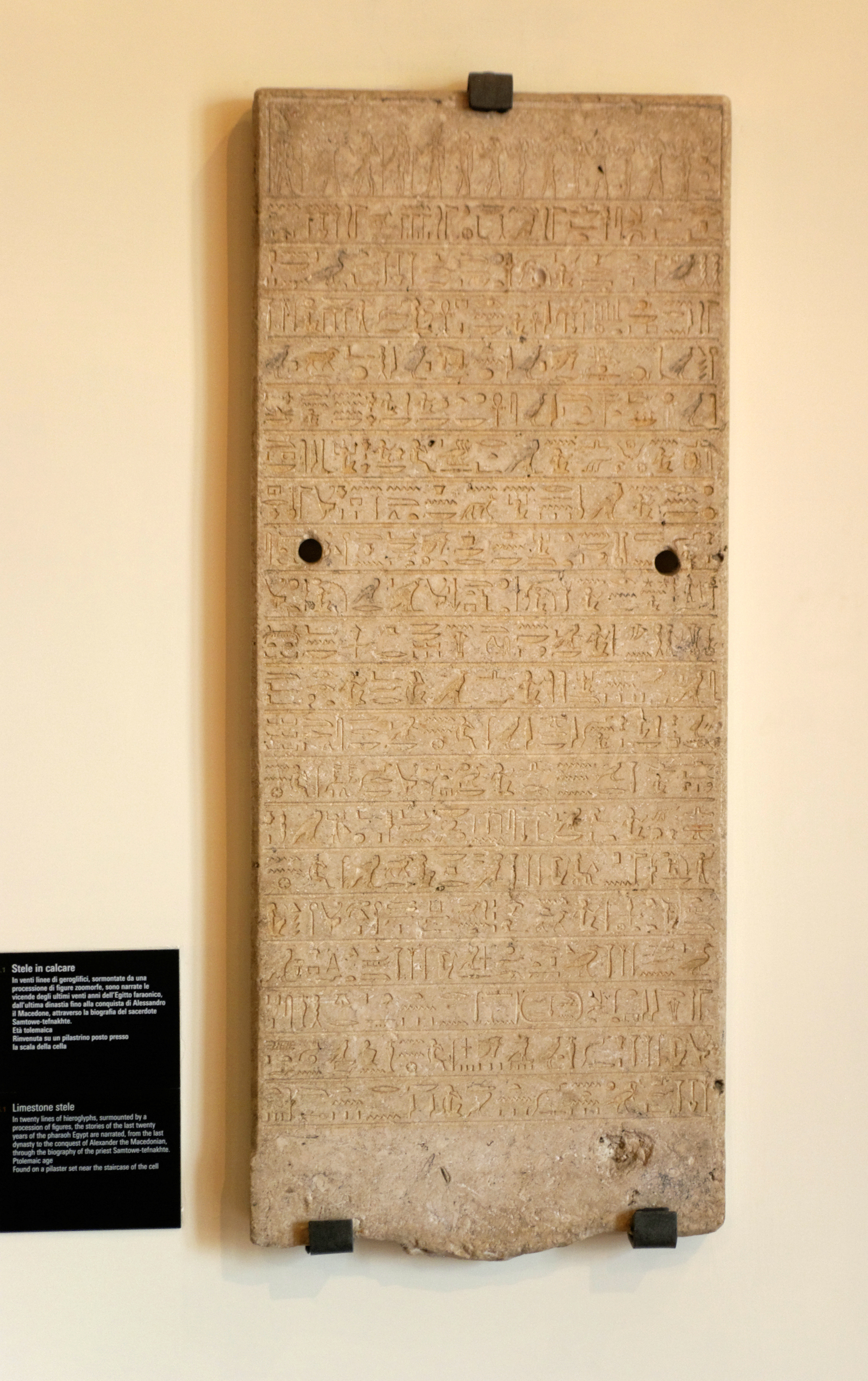
- Naples Stela of Sematawytefnakht, now in the museum of Naples.
Egyptian name
M13 F36 M13 t I9 D40 sm3 t3w.j tfnx.t
'Sematawy-tefnakht'

Sematawytefnakht or Somtutefnakht and other variants (fl. 330s BCE), was an ancient Egyptian high official, known for having witnessed the conquest of Persian Egypt by Alexander the Great.

== Biography ==
Details about Sematawytefnakht's life are known by his limestone funerary stela – commonly referred to as the Naples Stela – which was originally placed in a temple at Herakleopolis Magna, then brought to the temple of Isis at Pompeii and now exhibited at Naples National Archaeological Museum (inv. 1035).

During his life, Sematawytefnakht held several high-status positions such as High Priest of Sekhmet, Priest of Horus, Royal treasurer, Sole companion, haty-a and iry-pat. He probably began his successful career under Nectanebo II of the 30th Dynasty. After the Achaemenid conquest of Egypt by Artaxerxes III, Sematawytefnakht swore allegiance to the new foreign pharaoh of Egypt, thus becoming a sort of collaborationist.

Sematawytefnakht joined the Persian military service under Darius III and was called to fight in the Battle of Issus (333 BCE) against Alexander's army. In his stela, he claimed that Heryshaf, the local deity of his hometown, appeared to him in a dream and warned him of the danger he would risk by fighting the battle. Strong with this premonition and frightened by Alexander's seemingly unstoppable advance, he fled from the battlefield and returned to Herakleopolis Magna in order to resume his religious offices, thus switching his allegiance once more when, shortly after, Alexander conquered Egypt (332 BCE).

At the end of his life, Sematawytefnakht praised and thanked Heryshaf for advicing him in the dream, thus allowing him to live a fulfilled life.

== Other people with the same name ==
Sematawytefnakht should not be confused with the namesake officer who, some three centuries earlier during the 26th Dynasty, escorted Psamtik I's daughter Nitocris I to Thebes for her adoption as Divine Adoratrice of Amun.

== See also ==
- Udjahorresnet, another ancient Egyptian official and collaborationist who had a comparable career during the early Persian 27th Dynasty.
