= Memphite Necropolis =

UNESCO World Heritage Site in Giza, Egypt

The Memphite Necropolis (or Pyramid Fields) is a series of ancient Egyptian funerary complexes occupying a 30-kilometer (19 mi) stretch on the Western Desert plateau near the ancient capital of Memphis (modern day Giza).

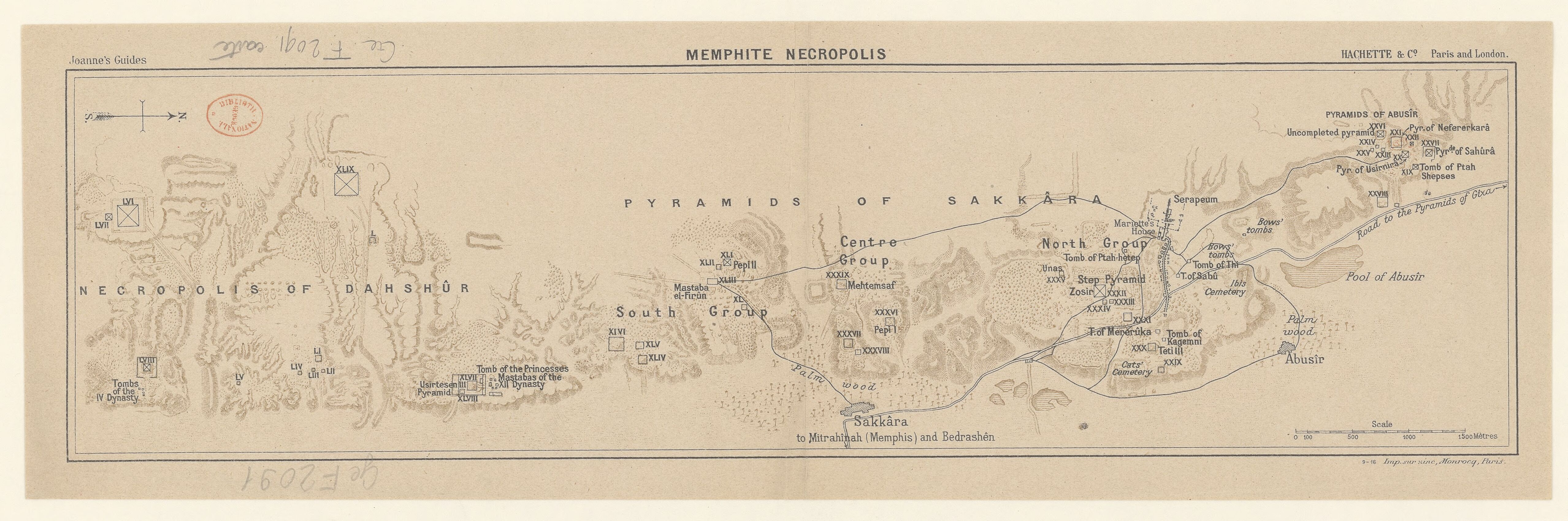
Map displaying the extent of the Memphite Necropolis (Bibliothèque nationale de France, département Cartes et plans, GE F CARTE-2091)

It includes the pyramid complexes of Giza, Abusir, Saqqara and Dahshur and is recognized by UNESCO as a World Heritage Site. In addition to many of the pyramids of the Old Kingdom, the necropolis is also populated with many tombs (e.g. mastabas), temples, and funerary artifacts. However, the site’s historical importance is not limited to these features. The necropolis also includes sites such as Heit al-Ghurab. Located in the southeastern area of the Giza Plateau, the site includes the village where craftsmen working on the tombs and pyramids would have lived. As a result of its status as physical and chronological behemoth, the Memphite Necropolis stands as a valuable tool to historians in understanding changes in Egyptian funerary culture and architecture across time.

== Etymology ==
The Memphite Necropolis takes its name from the nearby capital city of Memphis. Memphis itself is a Greek translation of the Egyptian Men-nefer, the name of the nearby pyramid of the sixth-dynasty (c. 2325 – c. 2150 BCE) king Pepi I. Memphis was also known as Hut-ka-Ptah (“mansion of the ka of Ptah”) owing to the city's association with Ptah, a powerful deity often associated with creation stories and craftsman.

== History ==
Use of the various sections of the Memphite Necropolis spans a great portion of Ancient Egypt itself. The first portion of the necropolis to be established was at the site of Saqqara beginning in the First Dynasty. Next to be established was Dahshur during the Fourth Dynasty followed by Giza also during the Fourth Dynasty and finally Abusir in the Fifth Dynasty. However, it is key to remember that while these sites were not built consecutively, they did not fall into disuse once construction of the next had begun. After construction all of these burial grounds would remain in active use as well as maintain important roles in society for thousands of years.

== Saqqara ==
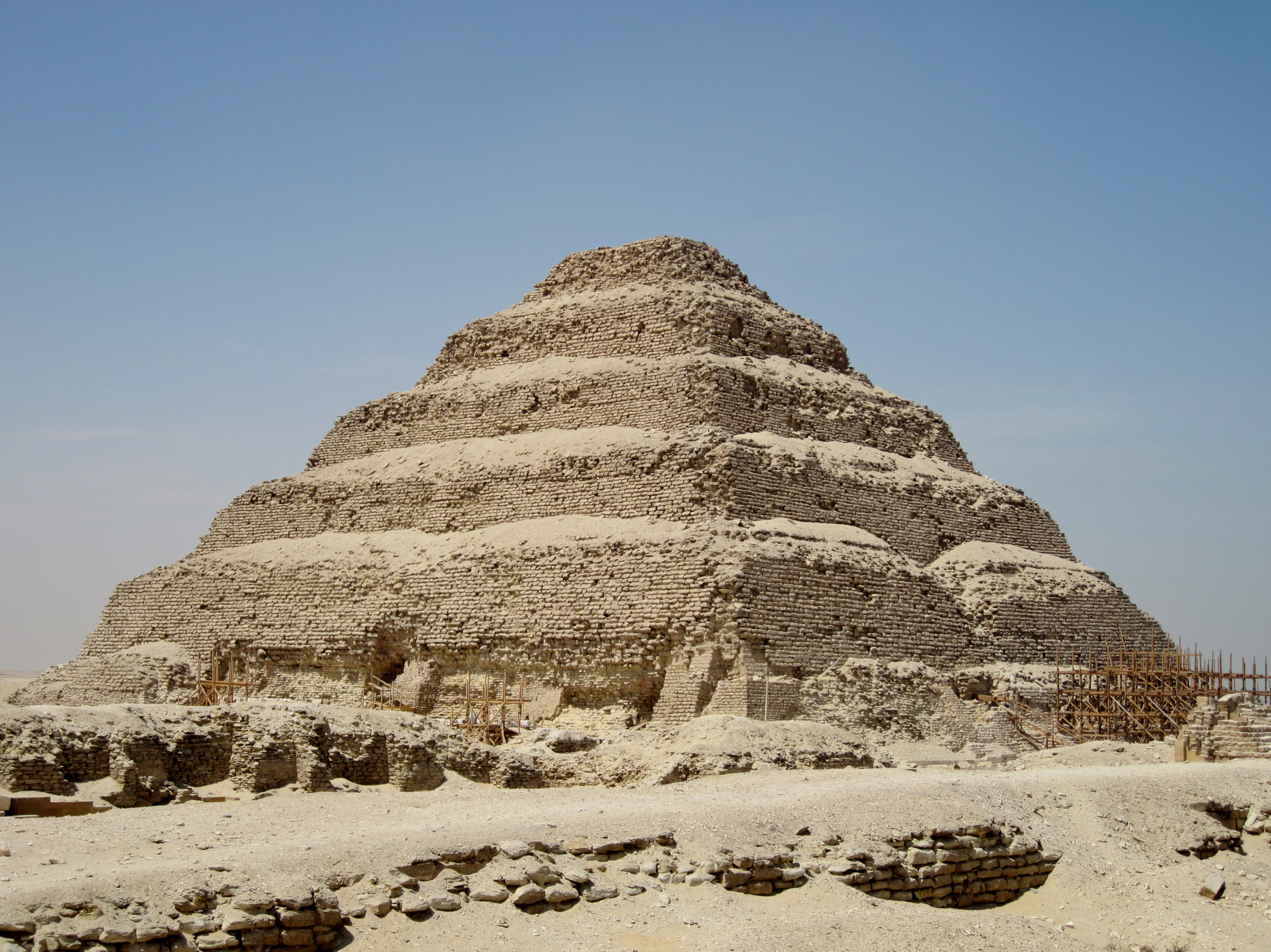
Step pyramid of Pharaoh Djoser from the 3rd Dynasty of the Ancient Empire in Egypt (around 2670 BC). Chr.) (Wikimedia)

Saqqara is the site of the first Egyptian pyramid, the Pyramid of Djoser, and thus the first pyramid field in the Memphite Necropolis, established in the 27th century BC during the Third Dynasty, with another 16 pyramids built over the centuries though the Fifth Dynasty. However, the site was used for burials at least as early as the First Dynasty (c. 32nd century BC), and remained in almost continuous use as a cemetery for 3000 years until the Ptolemaic Period (30 BCE).

== Dahshur ==
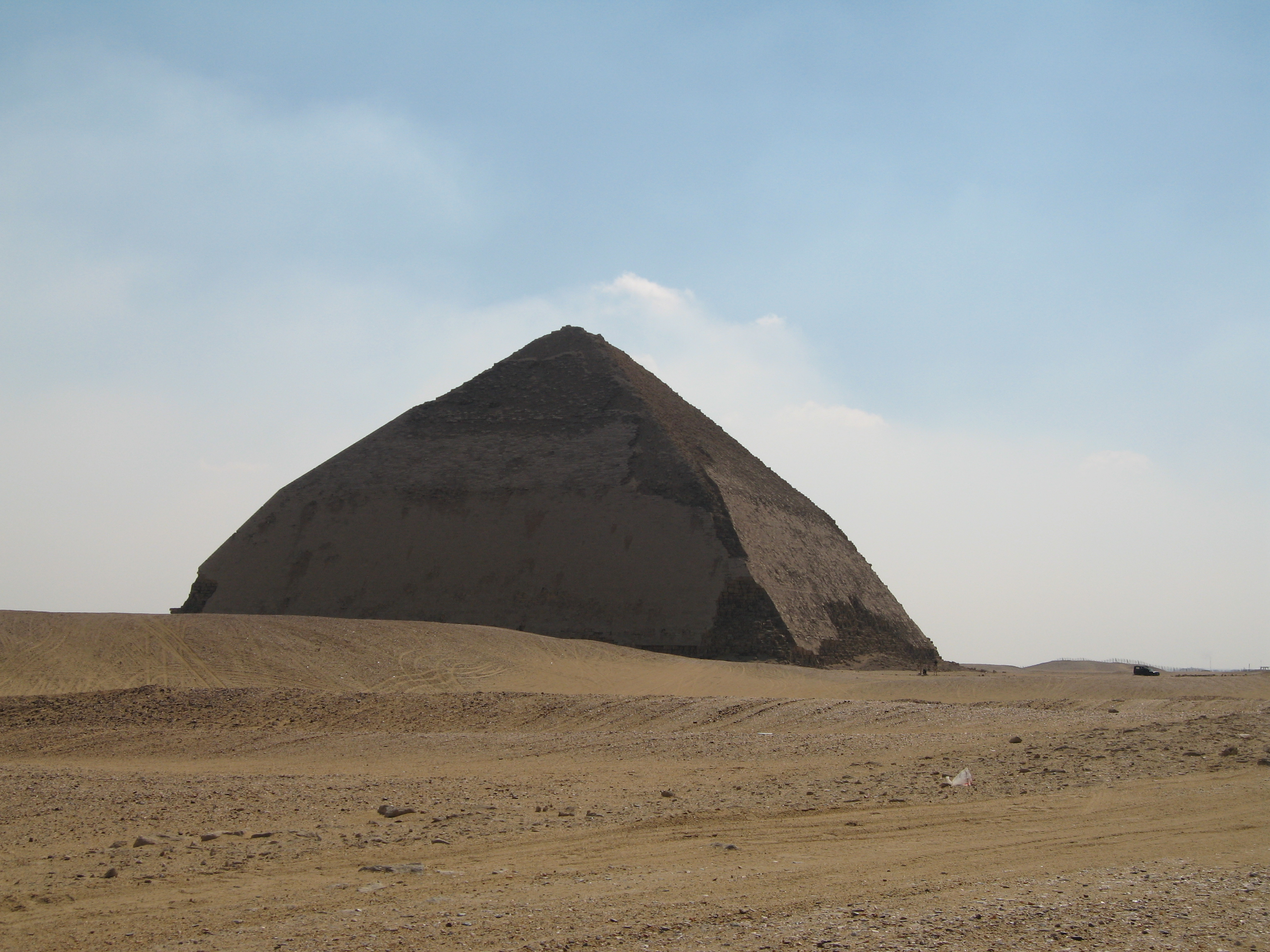
Sneferu's Bent Pyramid (Wikimedia)

Dahshur is the second of the pyramid complexes to be established in Egypt, including the unique Bent Pyramid of Sneferu in the Fourth Dynasty during the Old Kingdom (27th century BC). In addition to the Bent Pyramid, Dahshur is also the site of the Red Pyramid; one of two others built by Sneferu before his death. It is the third-largest pyramid in Egypt and also believed to be the first successful example of the smooth-sided pyramids that are now emblematic of Egyptian pyramid architecture. After the construction of Sneferu's pyramids the site would continue to be used intermittently as a burial ground and pyramid field for a millennium. The last of more than six pyramids was built in Dahshur during the 13th Dynasty occurring in the Second Intermediate Period (18th century BC).

The Dahshur necropolis is 2.5 by 6 kilometres in size and is located roughly 30 kilometres south of modern-day Cairo.

== Giza ==
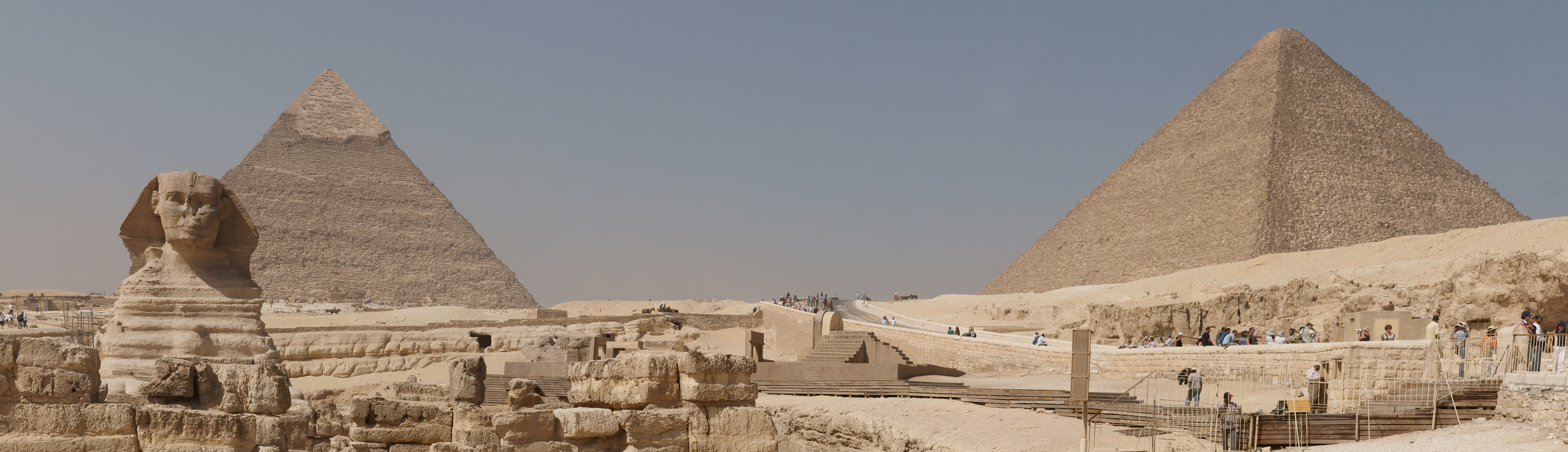
Panorama of the Great Sphinx of Giza, Khafre's Pyramid and Pyramid of Cheops. (Wikimedia)

The Pyramids of Giza were the third site to be built, during the Fourth Dynasty (2613–2494 BCE). Building in Giza also includes the Pyramid of Khufu (the only remaining wonder of the ancient world), the Great Sphinx of King Khafre, and many other historically significant burials.

Map of Giza pyramid complex (Wikimedia)

The Giza Plateau is also the location of Heit al-Ghurab, which served as a village for craftsmen who built not only the pyramids, but also tombs, temples, and monuments. The archeological value of this site is immense at it provides a record of the lives of ordinary Egyptians – a perspective that is lost when only sources from society elites are studied. This site can be compared to Deir el-Medina, which, located adjacent to the Valley of the Kings, served a similar role for those artisans responsible for the construction of the tombs and temples there.

Heit al-Ghurab can be seen listed as "builders quarters" on the map of the Giza pyramid complex. As the map reveals, these laborers lived on the borders of the construction sites which enabled ready access for work.

== Abusir ==
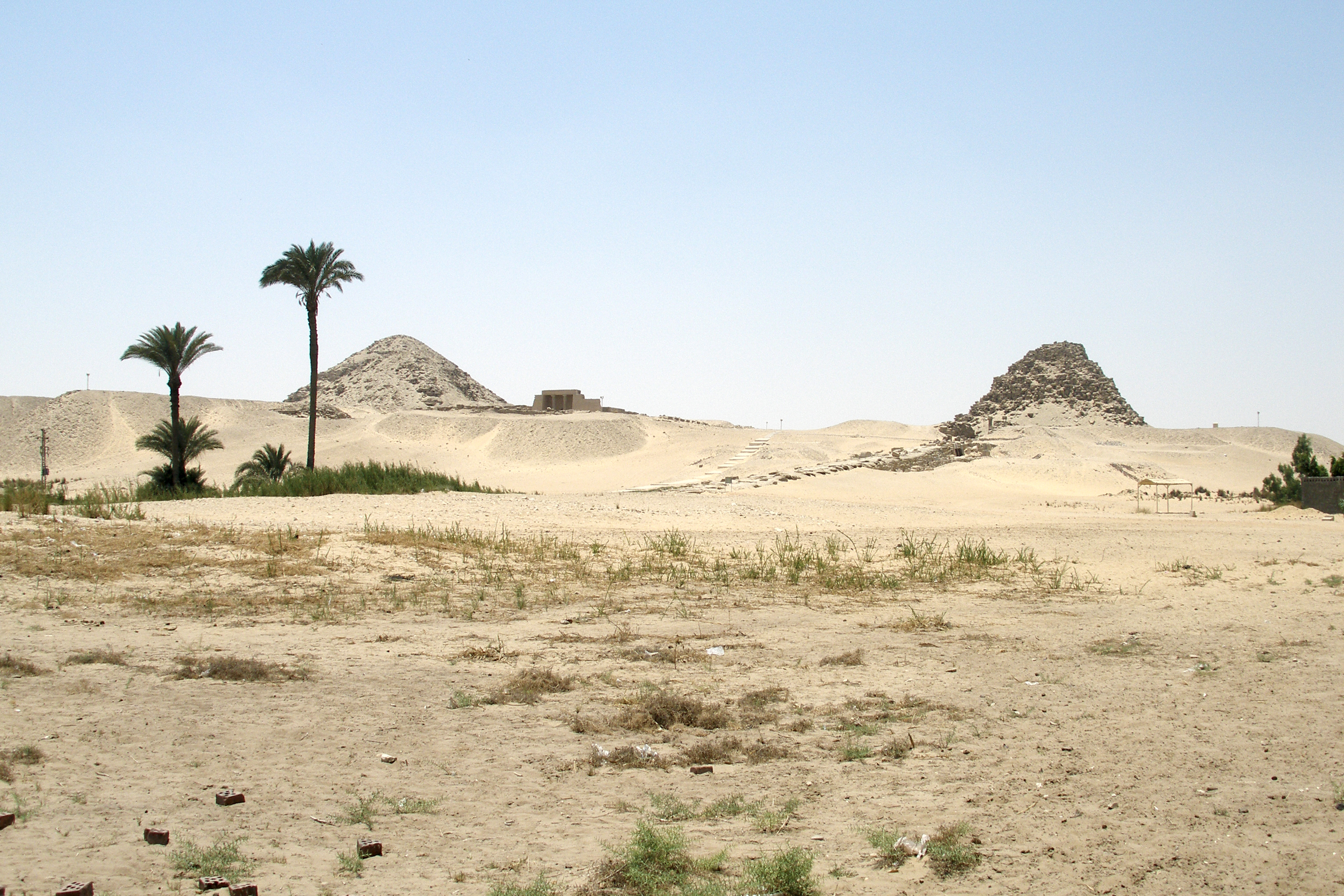
Pyramids of Abusir. "The House or Temple of Osiris". Abusir, Ancient Egypt. (Wikimedia)

Abusir, the fourth and last of the pyramid fields to be established, was built during the Fifth Dynasty at the end of the Old Kingdom. In this time 14 pyramids were built in addition to a large number of other mastabas and other tombs. The pyramids built at Abusir are considerably smaller than those that had been built at Saqqara, Dahshur, and Giza, which supports the narrative of suspected economic and social struggles commonly associated with this period of Egyptian history.

== Excavations ==
Burials in the Memphite Necropolis include the Apis bulls, falcons, ibises, baboons, and boats.

The tomb of Nakht-Min at the Abusir-Memphite Necropolis (Kahled Daoud) [ Egypt Exploration Society ]

An Exploratory Geophysical Survey at the Pyramid Complex of Senwosret III at Dahshur, Egypt, in Search of Boats from Copyright © 1999–2011 John Wiley & Sons, Inc. All Rights Reserved retrieved 12:06GMT 1.10.11

research on constructions within Dashar necropolis since 2008 © 2011 Deutsches Archäologisches Institut (re-retrieved 12:18GMT 2.10.11)

== See also ==
- Memphis
- Saqqara
- Dahshur
- Giza Necropolis
- Central Field, Giza
- Giza East Field
- Giza West Field
- Abusir
- Ahmed Fakhry
- Selim Hassan
- Jacques de Morgan
- Jacques Kinnaer
- Miroslav Verner
- Karl Richard Lepsius
- Mark Lehner
