= The Divine Worshipper =

2008 novel by Christian Jacq

- Author: Christian Jacq
- Translator: Sue Dyson
- Series: Vengeance of the Gods
- Genre: Historical Fiction
- Publisher: Simon & Schuster
- Publication date: April 2008
- Media type: Print (Hardback & Paperback)
- Pages: 341 pp
- ISBN: 978-1-84737-059-4
- OCLC: 183917200
- Preceded by: Manhunt

The Divine Worshipper is a historical fiction novel written by Christian Jacq. The story follows on from the previous book, Manhunt, in which the young scribe Kel, aided by his wife Nitis and friend Bebon, try to clear his name of murders he did not commit. It takes place in ancient Egypt during the reign of the pharaoh Amasis (alternatively translated in the book as Ahmose) in 528 BC. The book was originally published in France in 2007, and translated and published in English in 2008.

== Plot summary ==
Accused of murders he did not commit, a young scribe named Kel is continuously evading the forces of justice in a desperate attempt to prove his innocence. Aided by Nitis (a beautiful priestess and his wife) and Bebon (an actor and his closest friend), Kel manages to flee south and eventually take refuge in Thebes, safely out of the reach of the pharaoh Ahmose and his main pursuers, Judge Gem and Henat, head of the spies.

Protected by the spiritual leader of Thebes, a venerable lady known as The Divine Worshipper, Kel manages to finally clear his name, but not in time to save Egypt, as the Persian forces swarm across the border and overrun the country.

== Historical basis ==
While a work of fiction, The Divine Worshipper contains elements of fact.

The Persian army overran Egypt in 526 BC, when the book concludes. Led by Cambyses, this was the beginning of the 27th dynasty and 120 years of Persian occupation. Historical facts are the betrayal of those close to Pharaoh Amasis II, particularly General Phanes, Udjahorresnet and Kroisos.

The Divine Worshipper of this time was Ankhnesneferibre. She occupied her post for sixty years.
