= Nakhtmin (disambiguation) =

Nakhtmin (also Minnakht) was an Ancient Egyptian scribe and general during the reign of pharaoh Tutankhamun.

Nakhtmin may also refer to:

- Nakhtmin (scribe), Middle Kingdom Lector Priest whose stela is now in Zagreb
- Nakhtmin (charioteer), Nineteenth Dynasty military official under Ramesses II
- Nakhtmin (troop commander), Nineteenth Dynasty troop commander and royal envoy during the reign of Ramesses II
