= Hetepi =

Hetepi (he who is satisfied) was an ancient Egyptian official of the Third Dynasty under king Djoser. Hetepi is mainly known from his monumental tomb found at Abusir-South. It belongs to the few well excavated and decorated Egyptian tombs of the Third Dynasty. The tomb was discovered in the winter season 1999–2000 by a Czech expedition. Alone the huge size of the tomb underlines the importance of Hetepi.

Hetepi's tomb is a monumental mastaba, almost 50 meters long. At the south east corner there are the remains of a chapel built into the mastaba. The mastaba was made of mud bricks, while the chapel was built of limestone blocks. Only the entrance of the chapel was decorated. On the south side of the entrance Hetepi is shown, standing. Next to him and in smaller scale, is depicted the steward (imy-r pr) Nakht, evidently a servant in Hetepi's household. This scene is only painted in black ink on the stones and is therefore unfinished. On the other side of the entrance is Hetepi shown sitting in front of an offering table. Under his chair is again shown the steward Nakhti. This scenes in carved as relief into stone.

Hetepi bears several titles; some of them are unique. He was strong of voice of the king, great one of the tens of the mansion of lifer and keeper of the secrets of the sekheru hall, inspector of the custodians of the ornaments of the Wadjet phyle and inspector of the Estate, seat of the goddess Harmehit.
