= Iufaa =

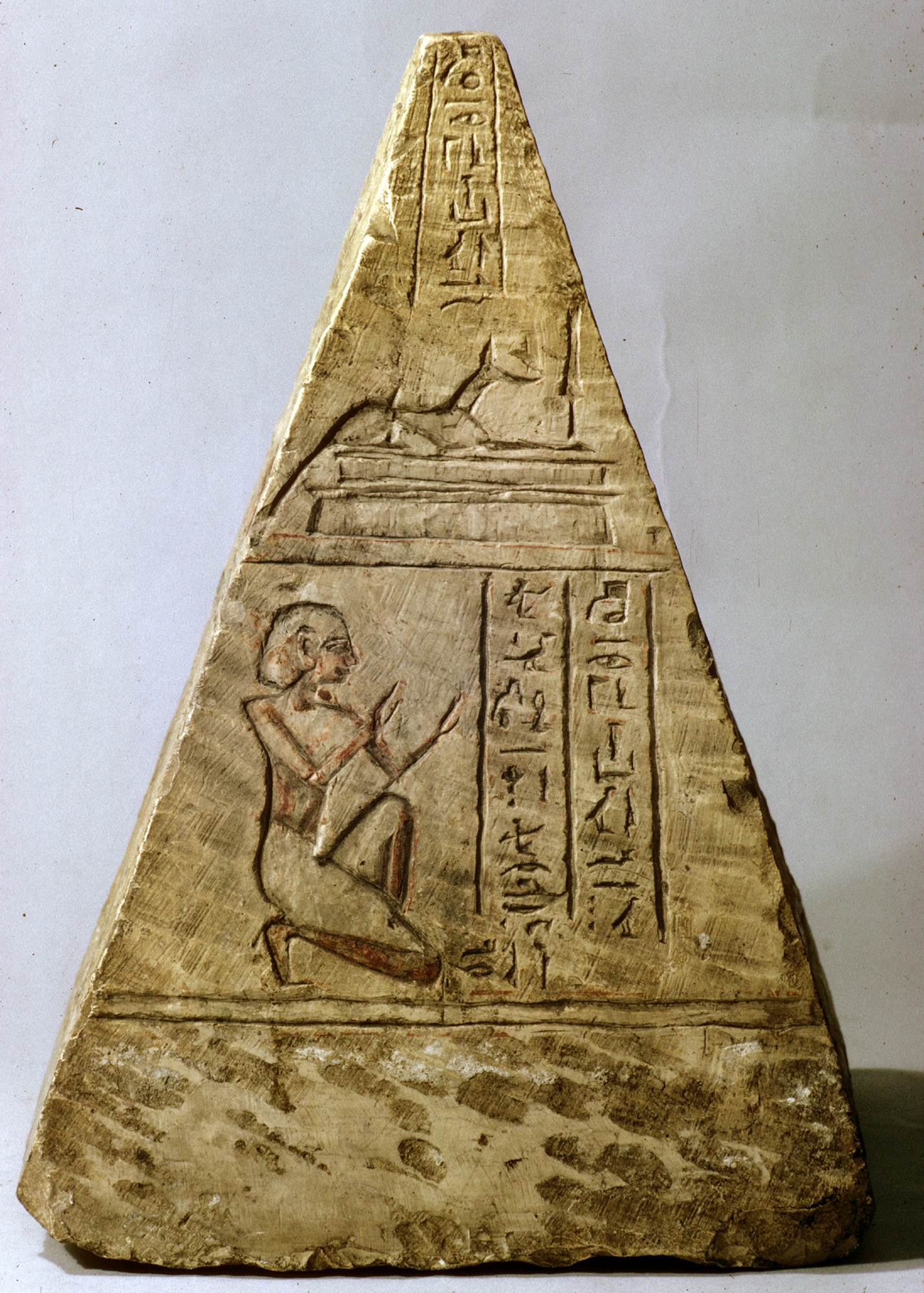
Pyramidion of Iufaa, MET

Iufaa was an Egyptian priest and administer of palaces who lived around 500 BC. His mummy was discovered in an unmolested tomb by Czech archaeologists under the direction of Ladislav Bareš and Miroslav Verner in February 1998. The discovery of an unmolested Egyptian tomb of this significance is a very rare occurrence. The mummy was in a state of advanced decomposition due to the proximity of the water table, however many of the tomb's artifacts were in good condition.

== Discovery ==
In 1994, a team of archaeologists from the Czech Institute of Egyptology at Charles University in Prague began investigating a second large shaft tomb at Abusir in Egypt. In 1996, they located a burial chamber at the bottom of the shaft, 80 feet (20 m) below the desert. As they excavated they found tunnels that had been previously built by looters; these tunnels ended a few meters (yards) above the burial chamber. The shaft had been built through weak, brittle clay, and the team took the precaution of building a protective roof of reinforced concrete over the burial chamber to prevent a collapse of the shaft. The tomb and its vaulted roof were created from white limestone blocks, and a white limestone sarcophagus almost filled the chamber. The contents of the tomb were intact, making this the first unrobbed shaft tomb found in Egypt since 1941. The researchers dated the tomb to the late 26th dynasty (before 525 BC).

The sarcophagus was surrounded by 408 ushabtis, symbolizing servants for the dead, and the tomb also contained stone vessels, wooden furniture, pottery, and papyri scrolls. Some of the pottery had been imported from the Aegean. The walls of the tomb were covered with texts from the Book of the Dead, and inscriptions in the tomb identified the man buried as Iufaa, a high-ranking priest and palace official.

The team of researchers opened the sarcophagus of Iufaa in February 1998. The sarcophagus contained a black-grayish basalt mummiform sarcophagus. Inside this was a wooden coffin which contained the mummified remains of Iufaa, covered in a net of blue beads. The chamber was located almost at groundwater level, which resulted in high humidity. The humidity had caused the soft tissue and wrappings on the mummy to disintegrate, leaving only a preserved skeleton, which was "more or less complete". The papyri scrolls were also in poor condition.

== Family ==
In 2001, the team investigated east of Iufaa's tomb and found two smaller shafts, with a sanctuary between them. Three bodies were buried in those two shafts. According to inscriptions, the other mummies were of Imakhetkherresnet, Nekawar, and Padihor. Tests showed that Imakhetkerresnet, who was between 35 and 45 at her death, and Nekawar, aged 55 to 65 at his death, were biologically related to Iufaa. It is likely that Imakhetkerresnet was Iufaa's sister, as inscriptions in both tombs identified them as having a mother named Ankhtisi, and Nekawer is probably either Iufaa's father or his brother. The other man, Padihor, aged 28–32 at death, was not biologically related to the others.

== Life and death ==
Examination of Iufaa's skeleton revealed that he was 25–35 years old at his death. He had very serious tooth decay and "advanced fusion of cranial sutures". His skeleton also showed severe biparietal thinning, a rare condition that today occurs in Europe in only 0.4–1.3% of people. Iufaa also had slight arthritis and suffered from severe osteoporosis. The team speculated that Iufaa "suffered from some unknown long-lasting disease" which caused the osteoporosis and led directly to his death.
