= Christian Jacq =

French author and Egyptologist

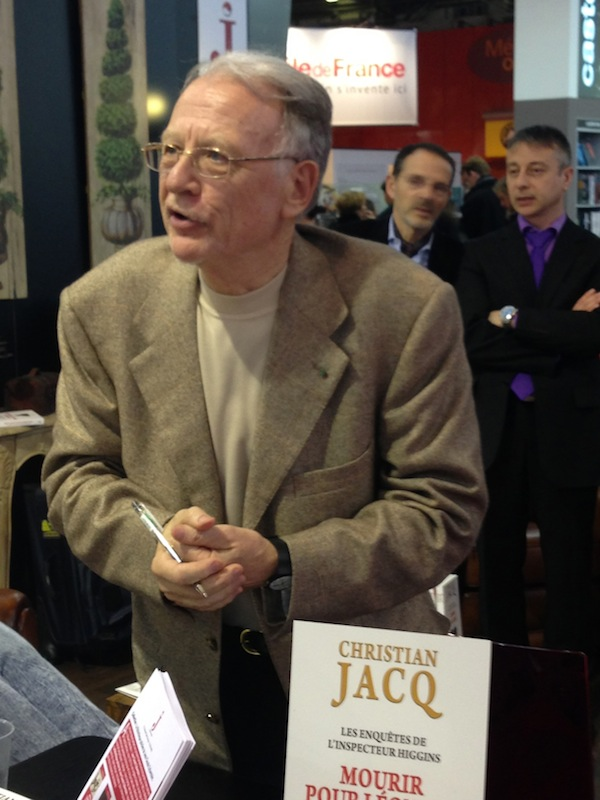
Jacq in 2013

Christian Jacq (French: [ʒak]; born 28 April 1947) is a French author and Egyptologist. He has written several novels about ancient Egypt, notably a five book series about pharaoh Ramses II, a character whom Jacq admires greatly.

== Biography ==
Born in Paris, Jacq's interest in Egyptology began when he was thirteen, when he read History of Ancient Egyptian Civilization by Jacques Pirenne. This inspired him to write his first novel. By the time he was eighteen, he had written eight books. His first commercially successful book was Champollion the Egyptian, published in 1987. As of 2004, he has written over fifty books, including several non-fiction books on the subject of Egyptology.

Jacq has a doctorate in Egyptian Studies from the Sorbonne. He and his wife later founded the Ramses Institute, which is dedicated to creating a photographic description of Egypt for the preservation of endangered archaeological sites.

Between 1995 and 1997, he published his best-selling five book suite Ramsès, which is today published in over twenty-five countries.

== Books ==
=== The Ramses Series ===
The story of the greatest Pharaoh in history

1. The Son of Light (1995)
2. The Temple of a Million Years Formerly published as The Eternal Temple (1995)
3. The Battle of Kadesh (1996)
4. The Lady of Abu Simbel (1996)
5. Under the Western Acacia (1997)

=== The Stone of Light Series ===
1. Nefer the Silent
2. The Wise Woman
3. Paneb the Ardent
4. The Place of Truth

=== The Queen of Freedom Trilogy ===
The tale of Queen Ahhotep and her crusade to liberate her nation from the Hyksos oppressors

1. The Empire of Darkness
2. War of the Crowns
3. The Flaming Sword

=== The Judge of Egypt Trilogy ===
In the Age of Ramses, Egypt's power is unchallenged. However, a dark conspiracy seeks to strike at the Pharaoh ... only an idealistic judge and a young doctor stand between Egypt and oblivion.

1. Beneath the Pyramid
2. Secrets of the Desert
3. Shadow of the Sphinx

=== The Mysteries of Osiris Series ===
1. The Tree of Life
2. The Conspiracy of Evil
3. The Way of Fire
4. The Great Secret

=== The Vengeance of the Gods Series ===
1. Manhunt
2. The Divine Worshipper

=== The Mozart Series ===
1. The Great Magician
2. The Son of Enlightenment
3. The Brother of Fire
4. The Beloved of Isis

=== Other books ===
- Egyptian Magic (non-fiction 1985)
- The Black Pharaoh
- The Tutankhamun Affair
- For the Love of Philae
- Champollion the Egyptian
- Master Hiram and King Solomon
- The Living Wisdom of Ancient Egypt (non-fiction)
- Fascinating Hieroglyphics (non-fiction 1997)
- Magic and Mystery in Ancient Egypt (non-fiction 1998)
- The Wisdom of Ptah Hotep (non-fiction 2006)
- Tutankhamun: The Last Secret (February 2009)
- The Judgement of the Mummy (2009)
- Egypt (non fiction 2009)
