= Abusir =

Village in Giza Governorate, Egypt

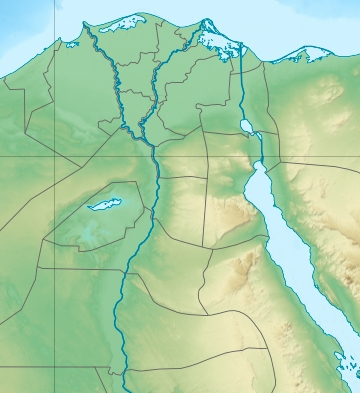
- Location within Northern Egypt
- 29.9°N 31.2°E
- Location: Egypt
- Region: Giza Governorate

UNESCO World Heritage Site
- Criteria: Cultural: (i)(iii)(vi)
- Designated: 1979 (3rd session)
- Part of: Memphis and its Necropolis – the Pyramid Fields from Giza to Dahshur
- Reference no.: 86-002

pr Z1 st ir A40
Busiri
in hieroglyphs
Era: Old Kingdom
(2686–2181 BC)

Abusir (Arabic: ابو صير Egyptian Arabic pronunciation: [æbuˈsˤiːɾ]; Egyptian pr wsjr; Coptic: ⲃⲟⲩⲥⲓⲣⲓ busiri, "the resting place of Osiris"; Ancient Greek: Βούσιρις) is the name given to an ancient Egyptian archaeological pyramid complex comprising the ruins of four kings' pyramids dating to the Old Kingdom period, and is part of the Pyramid Fields of the Memphis and its Necropolis UNESCO World Heritage Site.

The pyramid complex is named after the neighbouring village of Abusir, in the markaz (county) of Badrashin, Giza. The Abusir pyramid complex is located on the Western Desert plateau at the edge of the cultivated plain, with the Giza Pyramids to its north, and Saqqara to its south, and served as one of the main elite cemeteries for the ancient Egyptian capital city of Memphis. Several other villages in northern and southern Egypt are named Abusir or Busiri.

The locality of Abusir took its turn as the focus of the prestigious western burial rites operating out of the then-capital of Memphis during the Old Kingdom Fifth Dynasty. As an elite cemetery, neighbouring Giza had by then "filled up" with the massive pyramids and other monuments of the Fourth Dynasty, leading the Fifth Dynasty pharaohs to seek sites elsewhere for their own funerary monuments.

Abusir was the origin of the largest find of Old Kingdom papyri to date — the Abusir Papyri. In the late nineteenth century, a number of Western museums acquired collections of fragmentary papyri from the administrative (temple) records of one Abusir funerary cult, that of king Neferirkare Kakai. This discovery was supplemented in the late twentieth century when excavations by a Czech expedition to the site revealed papyri from two other cult complexes, that of the pharaoh Neferefre (also read Raneferef) and for the king's mother Khentkaus II.

The Czech Institute of Egyptology of the Faculty of Arts, Charles University in Prague has been conducting excavations at Abusir since 1960, beginning with the mastaba of Ptahshepses, directed by Zbyněk Žába. The concession was extended since 1976 with the southern part of the royal necropolis, directed by Miroslav Verner. Since 1991, the institute excavates also at the site of Abusir South. The excavations are presently directed by Miroslav Bárta.

There are considerable catacombs near the ancient town of Busiris, as stated in (Pliny xxxvi. 12. s. 16). To the south of Busiris one great cemetery appears to have stretched over the plain. The Heptanomite Busiris was in fact a hamlet standing at one extremity of the necropolis of Memphis.

== Necropolis ==
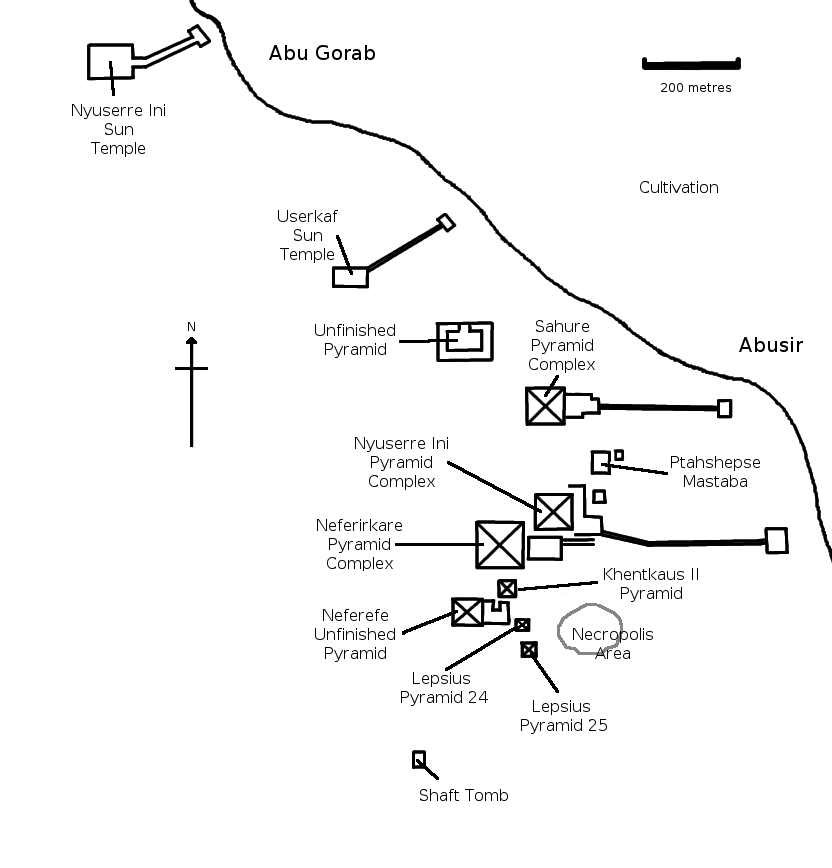
Abusir necropolis

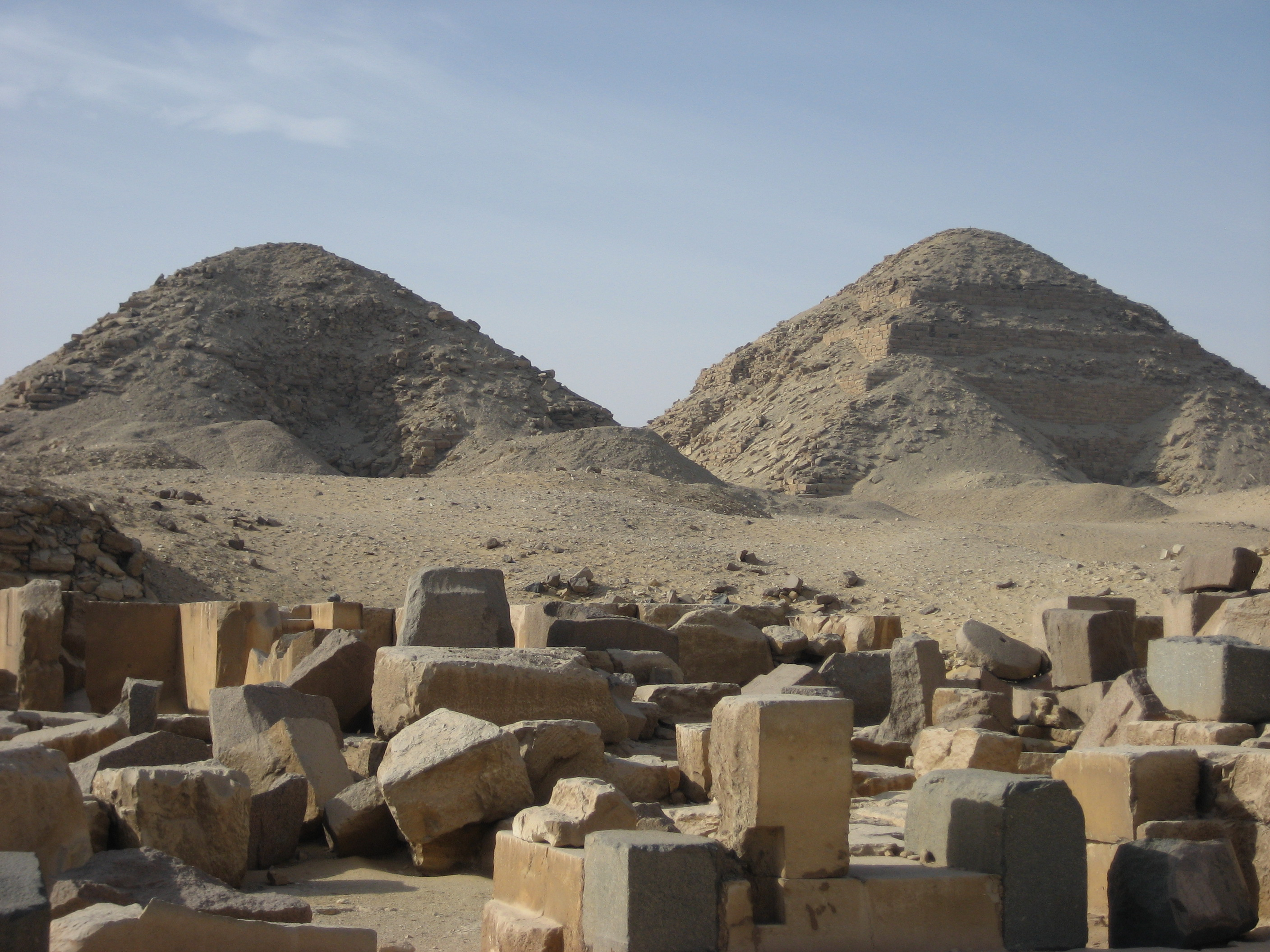
Abusir pyramids, 2009

Earliest tombs on the site are from the Early Dynastic Period, First Dynasty. Tombs, including stairway tombs, were uncovered north of pyramid field.

There are a total of four kings' pyramids at this site, which served as the main royal necropolis during the Fifth Dynasty. The quality of construction of the Abusir pyramids is inferior to those of the Fourth Dynasty; perhaps signalling a decrease in royal power or a less vibrant economy. They are smaller than their predecessors, and are built of low quality local stone. All of the major pyramids at Abusir were built as step pyramids, although the largest of them—the Pyramid of Neferirkare—is believed to have originally been built as a step pyramid some seventy metres in height and then later transformed into a "true" pyramid by having its steps filled in with loose masonry.

A map and complete list of excavated structures until the year 2019 is available in Bárta et al. (2020). The map is also published online as a searchable application.

=== Major pyramids ===
The three major royal pyramids are

- the earliest, Pyramid of Sahure, known for its finely carved reliefs
- the Pyramid of Neferirkare Kakai, the tallest pyramid at the site
- the Pyramid of Niuserre, the most intact pyramid at the site

The two unfinished royal pyramids are

- the incomplete Pyramid of Neferefre
- the unfinished pyramid of Shepseskare?

=== Smaller pyramids ===
- the pyramid of Queen Khentkaus II, wife of Neferirkare and mother of Neferefre and Niuserre
- Lepsius Pyramid no. 24 — The pyramid belonged to a woman, likely a queen. The name of the vizier Ptahshepses appears among builders' marks, which dates the pyramid to the time of Pharaoh Nyuserre
- Lepsius Pyramid no. 25 — Likely the pyramid of a queen from the Fifth Dynasty

=== Mastabas of courtiers ===
The tombs of several high officials and family members are located in the direct vicinity of their king's pyramid:

- the mastaba of Ptahshepses (vizier under Nyuserre)

Four mastabas south-east of the pyramid complex of Raneferef create a so-called "Nakthsare" cemetery, presumably tombs of the persons related to King Raneferef:

- the mastaba of Prince Nakhtsare (son of Raneferef or Nyuserre)
- the mastaba of "count" Kakaibaef
- the mastaba of Queen Khentkaus III, likely a spouse of Raneferef
- the mastaba of anonymous owner AS 31

=== Abusir South ===
Directly north of Saqqara is a cemetery of lower-ranking officials of the Early Dynastic Period and Old Kingdom. The earliest First Dynasty tombs are on the so-called "Bonnet cemetery" named after Hans Bonnet, who published the site. It was excavated in 1910 by Georg Steindorff and Uvo Hölscher. Recently, copper artefacts in the collection of Leipzig University, from the site, were studied. One vessel, ÄMUL 2162, was made of a peculiar material, arsenical copper with nickel, which could be imported to Egypt.

The Old Kingdom cemetery at Abusir South includes the following tombs:

- the tomb of Ity (early Fourth Dynasty)
- the tomb of Hetepi (priest, beginning of Third Dynasty)
- the tomb of Nyankhseshat (property custodian of the king, early Fourth Dynasty), with a stela of a Fifth-Dynasty official Sekhemka and his presumed spouse Henutsen
- the tomb of Kaaper (architect and priest, early Fifth Dynasty)
- the tomb of Rahotep (priest, end of Fifth Dynasty)
- the tomb of Fetekti (priest, end of Fifth Dynasty)
- the tomb of Qar and his sons (vizier, early Sixth Dynasty, sons from late Sixth Dynasty, reign of Pepi II Neferkare)
- the rock cut tomb of New Kingdom Nakhtmin (charioteer)

=== Saite-Persian cemetery ===
On a small hill directly south of the pyramid of Neferefre is a cemetery of tombs from the Saite period:

- the tomb of Udjahorresnet
- the tomb of Iufaa
- the tomb of Menekhibneko
- the tomb of Padihor
- tomb R3

=== A temple ===
Also found at Abusir were substantial remains of a Ramesside temple, perhaps built by Ramses II. The temple lies about 500 meters south east of the pyramids, close to the cultivation in the desert. The main building of the temple was built of limestone. There were three cellars, a small hall with four columns and a courtyard (with mudbrick walls) with ten limestone columns. The limestone building was placed within a larger complex made of mud bricks with a pylon and magazines. The temple seems to have been dedicated to the solar cult, in particular the gods Ra, Amun, and Nekhbet. Fragments of polychrome reliefs and numerous examples of the titles of Ramesses II have been recovered. The temple was built above the mud brick tombs of Third and Fifth Dynasty.

== Site looting during 2011 protests ==
Abusir, Saqqara and Dahshur suffered damage by looters during the 2011 Egyptian protests. Part of the false door from the tomb of the priest Rahotep was stolen, and store rooms were broken into. The looted structures are mapped out e.g. in this article.

== Climate ==
Köppen-Geiger climate classification system classifies its climate as hot desert (BWh), as the rest of Egypt.

Climate data for Abusir
Month	Jan	Feb	Mar	Apr	May	Jun	Jul	Aug	Sep	Oct	Nov	Dec	Year
Mean daily maximum °C (°F)	19.6 (67.3)	21.2 (70.2)	24.5 (76.1)	29 (84)	32.9 (91.2)	35.3 (95.5)	35.5 (95.9)	35.2 (95.4)	32.9 (91.2)	30.7 (87.3)	25.9 (78.6)	21.4 (70.5)	28.7 (83.6)
Daily mean °C (°F)	13.5 (56.3)	14.5 (58.1)	17.5 (63.5)	21.1 (70.0)	24.8 (76.6)	27.5 (81.5)	28.4 (83.1)	28.3 (82.9)	26.2 (79.2)	24.1 (75.4)	19.8 (67.6)	15.4 (59.7)	21.8 (71.2)
Mean daily minimum °C (°F)	7.4 (45.3)	7.9 (46.2)	10.6 (51.1)	13.3 (55.9)	16.8 (62.2)	19.8 (67.6)	21.3 (70.3)	21.4 (70.5)	19.5 (67.1)	17.5 (63.5)	13.7 (56.7)	9.4 (48.9)	14.9 (58.8)
Average precipitation mm (inches)	4 (0.2)	3 (0.1)	2 (0.1)	1 (0.0)	0 (0)	0 (0)	0 (0)	0 (0)	0 (0)	0 (0)	2 (0.1)	4 (0.2)	16 (0.7)
Source: Climate-Data.org, altitude: 18m

== See also ==
- Memphite Necropolis
- List of ancient Egyptian towns and cities
- List of ancient Egyptian sites, including sites of temples
- Double Pyramid
- List of megalithic sites
