= Nakhtmin (charioteer) =

Important ancient Egyptian military official under Ramses II

Nakhtmin was an important ancient Egyptian military official under Ramses II around 1250 BC. Nakhtmin is mainly known from his rock cut tomb that was found at Abusir. Nakhtmin was first charioteer of his majesty, also master of the horses and overseer of the charioteers. He was also royal envoy to all foreign lands. In this position he most likely took over diplomatic roles, leading ambassadorials missions to foreign lands. His wife was the lady of the house and singer of Bastet, lady of Ankhtawy, Hathor. Otherwise it is not much known about him. His tomb was cut into the rock at Abusir at the foot of the local hill. It has a front court with pillars and an inner chapel with two columns. From there, there is an entrance leading to four further chambers all connected by stairways. Here were found three skeletons, one of a man, one of a woman and one very badly preserved. The tomb chapel was once decorated with relief-decorated blocks, other blocks were decorated with paintings.
