= Udjahorresnet =

Ancient Egyptian official

Udjaḥorresnet
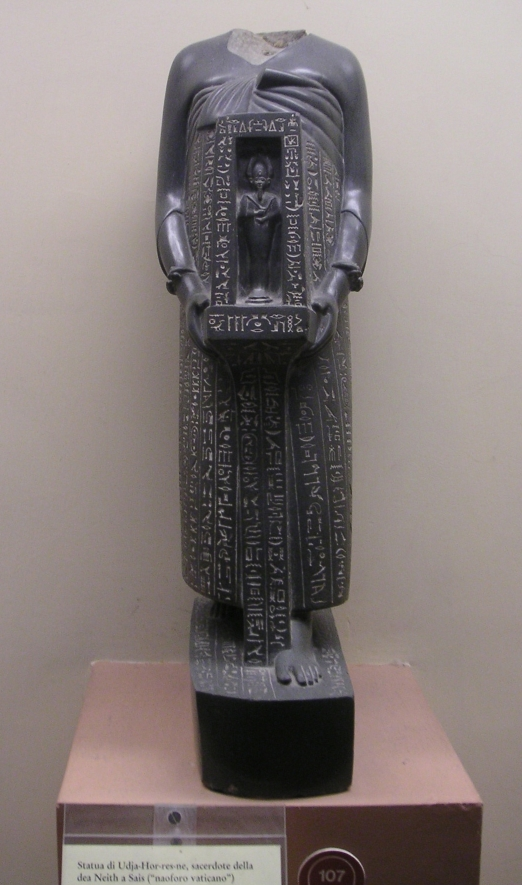
- Naophoros statue of Udjahorresnet. Rome, Museo Gregoriano Egizio
Egyptian name
w DA G5 M24 n t pr
- Dynasty: 26th-27th Dynasty
- Pharaoh: Amasis II, Psamtik III, Cambyses II, Darius I
- Burial: shaft tomb at Abusir?

Udjaḥorresnet (or Wedjaḥorresnet, and many other variants) was an ancient Egyptian high official who lived between the end of the 26th Dynasty and the beginning of the 27th Dynasty. He is mainly known for his efforts in promoting the Egyptian customs to the early Achaemenid kings of the 27th Dynasty.

Much of what we know about his career comes from his autobiography, inscribed on a statue depicting him; the statue, commonly called Naoforo vaticano (Italian for "Vatican naos-carrier"), was originally placed in the temple of Neith at Sais likely in Year 3 of Darius I (c. 519 BCE), but is now exhibited inside the Vatican Museums (more precisely in the Museo Gregoriano Egizio) of Rome.

== Biography ==
Early in his career, during the reigns of pharaohs Amasis II and Psamtik III, Udjahorresnet was a commander of ships (admiral), a physician and a priest of Neith in Sais. He was probably the Commander of the Egyptian Fleet under Amasis II, as one of his title on the inscription of his statue is "Commander of the King's fleet". According to the inscription, he was:

Chief of the Royal Navy under the King of Upper and Lower Egypt Amasis, Chief of the Royal Navy under the King of Upper and Lower Egypt Psamtik.

— Inscription of the statue of Udjahorresnet (fragment).

After the defeat at Pelusium in 525 BCE and the subsequent conquest of Egypt by Cambyses II, he eventually was relieved from his military duties.

Nevertheless, his influence grew unexpectedly under the reign of the foreign kings, Cambyses and his successor Darius I: Udjahorresnet apparently became a sort of collaborationist for the Persians, managing to enter in the royal court as chancellor and chief physician. From his statue, it is known that he used his influence to make Cambyses acknowledge and respect Egyptian customs. Acculturated by Udjahorresnet, the pharaoh paid homage to the goddess Neith at Sais, not before having driven out many Persian squatters who had settled within the temple; Udjahorresnet himself composed Cambyses' pharaonic titulary, calling him the Horus Smatawy (”He who unifies the Two Lands”) and the King of Upper and Lower Egypt Mesutire (“Offspring of Ra”). This view of Udjahorresnet (and other Achaemenid Egypt's high officials) being "collaborators" and the interpretation of his inscription are recently challenged by H. P. Colburn as a misconception resulted by earlier scholars' preconceived notion of the Achaemenid rule in Egypt being insidious. In fact, archaeological evidences suggest Udjahorresnet was venerated after his death for some time by at least a part of the Egyptian populace.

After Cambyses' death (522 BCE), Udjahorresnet's mission continued with Darius I: in fact, he even escorted Darius on his return to Susa and before returning to Egypt, he persuaded the new pharaoh to entrust to him the restoration of Per-ankh (the “House of Life”), a well known educational and cultural institution in ancient Egypt.

Udjahorresnet probably died later during Darius' reign. His huge shaft tomb at Abusir was excavated between 1980 and 1993, and found looted in antiquity. It is still a matter of debate if Udjahorresnet was indeed buried here or not; if not, it is possible that he died and was entombed in Persia rather than Egypt.
