= Miroslav Verner =

Czech egyptologist (born 1941)

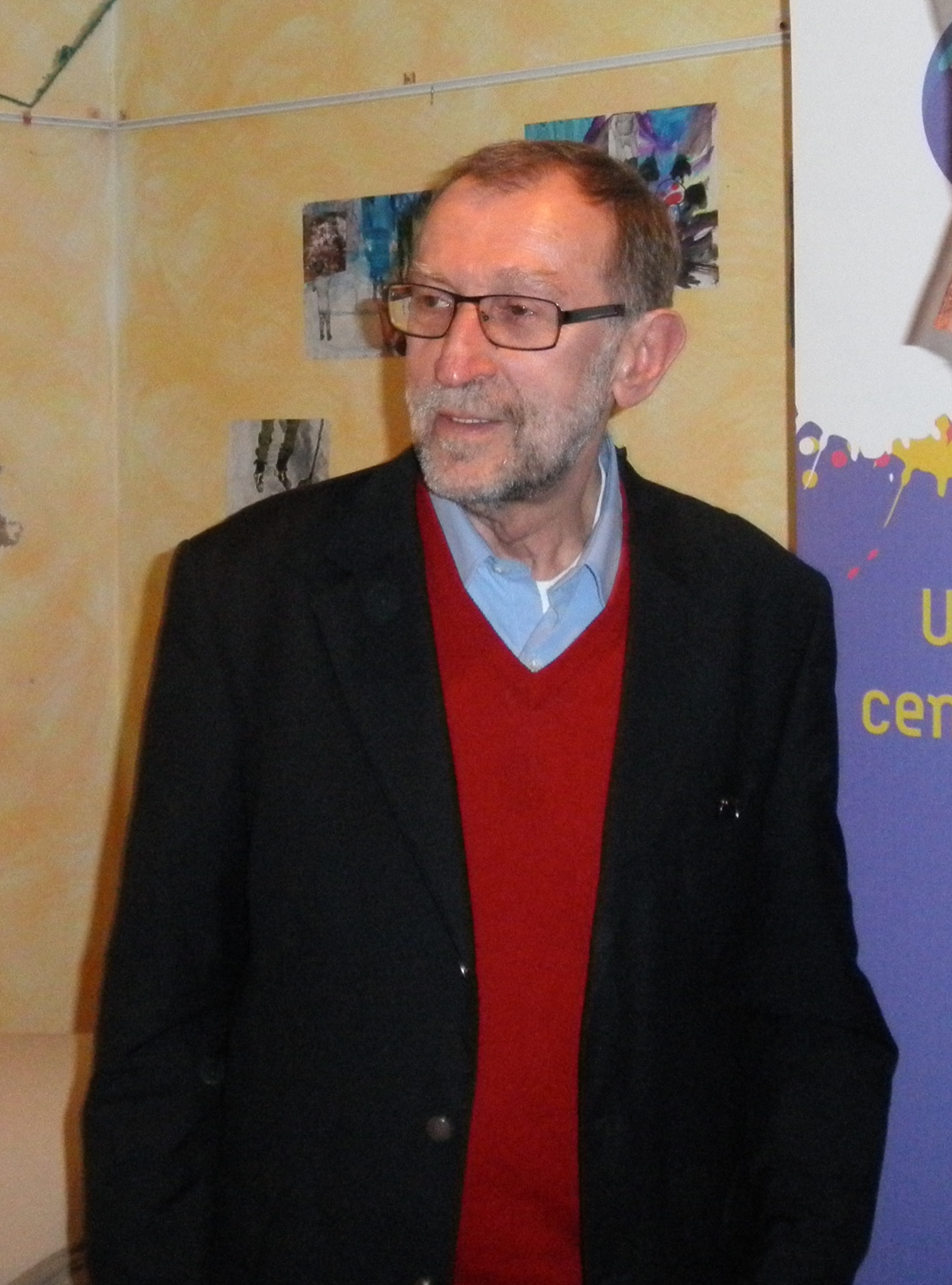
Miroslav Verner (2013)

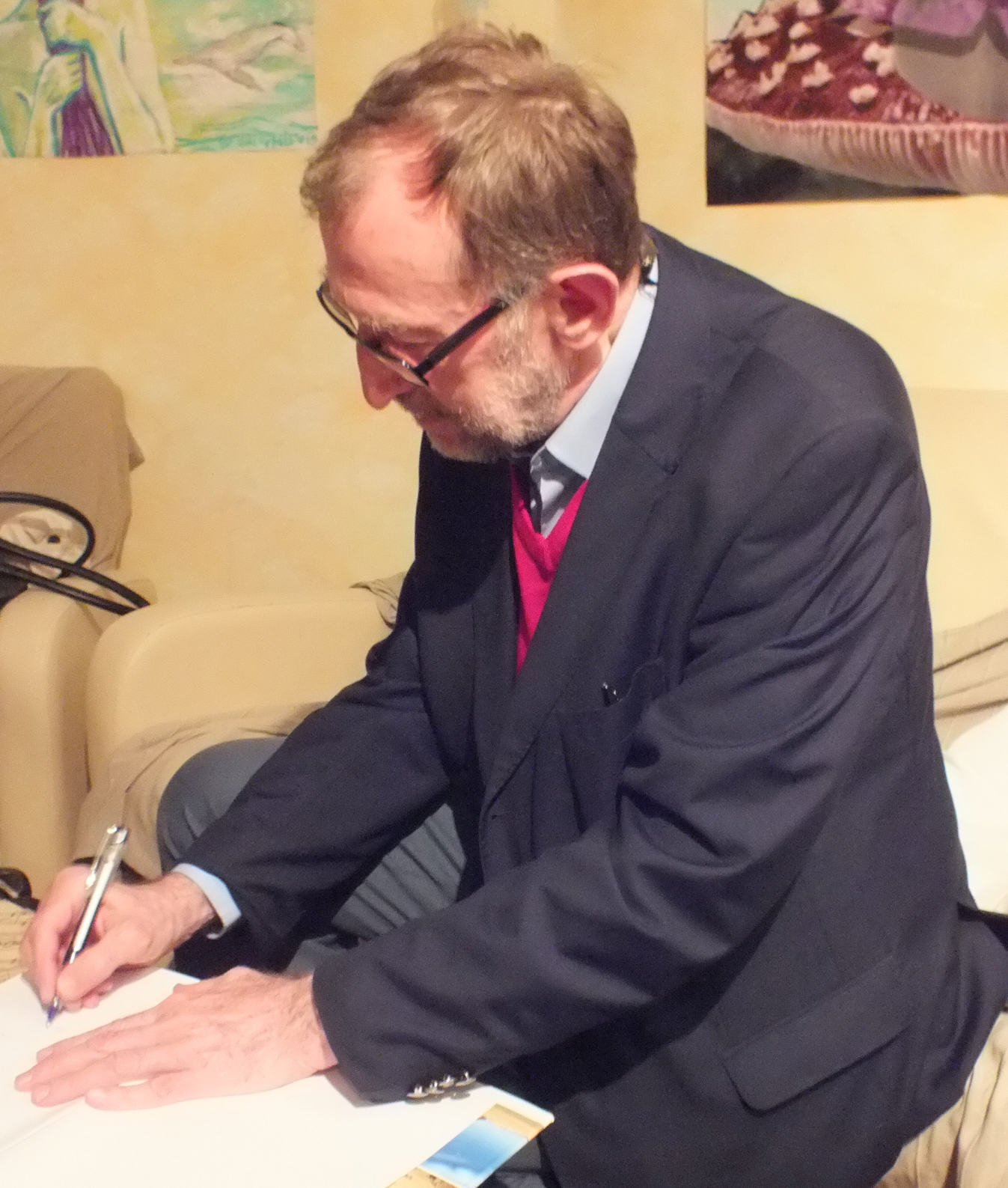
Miroslav Verner

Miroslav Verner (born 31 October 1941) is a Czech egyptologist who specializes in the history and archaeology of Ancient Egypt of the Old Kingdom and especially of the Fifth Dynasty of Egypt.

Verner is a specialist on the archaeology of the Old Kingdom pyramids, and published one of the fundamental syntheses on the subject, in a new, updated edition in 2021.

== Biography ==
Verner was born on 31 October 1941 in Brno, Protectorate of Bohemia and Moravia. He was the director of the Czechoslovak and later Czech Institute of Egyptology at the Faculty of Arts, Charles University for twenty-five years, and led the Czech excavations at Abusir. He has also been associated with the Universities of Vienna and Hamburg as well as the Charles University in Prague and the American University in Cairo.

Verner has been active in archaeological work since 1964, and he has been excavating at Abusir since 1976. In 1998, the tomb of Iufaa, an Egyptian priest and administer of palaces, was discovered in an undisturbed tomb by a team of Czech archaeologists from the Czech Institute of Egyptology, under the direction of Verner. The excavation report on the tomb was published by Ladislav Bareš and Květa Smoláriková.

In 2005, Verner became the director of the project called "Investigation of the civilisation of Ancient Egypt". The project ran until 2011, with the aim of studying the evolution of Egyptian society throughout its history.

== Bibliography ==
Selected monographs include:

- Abusir XII. Minor tombs in the Royal Necropolis I (The Mastabas of Nebtyemneferes and Nakhtsare, Pyramid Complex Lepsius no.24 and Tomb Complex Lepsius no.25) (with J. Krejčí and V. G. Callender), Prague 2008.
- Unearthing Ancient Egypt: Fifty years of the Czech Archaeological Exploration in Egypt [Hardcover] (with Hana Benešovská); Czech Institute of Egyptology; 31 December 2008. (ISBN 978-8073082062)
- Abusir IX — The Pyramid Complex of Raneferef, the Archaeology (v. 9, Pt. 1) [Hardcover], Czech Institute of Egyptology Charles Univers; 31 December 2006. (ISBN 978-8020013576)
- Abusir X — The Pyramid Complex of Raneferef: The Papyrus Archive (Abusir Monographs) (v. 10) (with Paule Posener-Kriéger and Hana Vymazalova) [Hardcover], Czech Institute of Egyptology; 1 December 2006. (ISBN 978-8073081546)
- Abusir VI--Djedkare's Family Cemetery, (with V. G. Callender); Czech Institute of Egyptology; Prague 2002
- Abusir III--The Pyramid Complex of Khentkhaus, (with Paule Posener-Kriéger and Peter Jánosi); Czech Institute of Egyptology; Prague 2001
- Abusir I--The Mastaba of Ptahshepses: Reliefs (Note: If the internet Archive link does not appear to work, please click on "reload" one time and it will upload the PDF Book); Czech Institute of Egyptology; Prague 1977
- Abusir: The Realm of Osiris (Hardcover), American University in Cairo Press: 2003, 248 pages (ISBN 977-424-723-X)
- Sons of the sun: rise and decline of the Fifth Dynasty (1 ed.). Prague: Czech Institute of Egyptology, Charles University. (ISBN 978-80-7308-541-4)
- The Pyramids: The Mystery, Culture, and Science of Egypt's Great Monuments, Grove Press, : October 2001, 432 pages (ISBN 978-0-8021-3935-1)
- The Pyramids. The Archaeology and History of Egypt's Iconic Monuments (2 ed.). Cairo: American University in Cairo Press. (ISBN 978-977-416-988-5)
- Forgotten pharaohs, lost pyramids: Abusir, Academia Skodaexport; Prague 1994. (ISBN 978-8020000224)

== Selected articles ==
- "Contemporaneous Evidence for the Relative Chronology of Dyns. 4 and 5", in: E. Hornung – R. Krauss – D. A. Warburton (eds.), Ancient Egyptian Chronology, (HdO. Section 1. The Near and Middle East 83), Leiden – Boston 2006 [v tisku]. Archived
- "The Abusir Pyramids Quarry and Supply Road", in: P. Jánosi (ed.), Structure and Significance. Thoughts on Ancient Egyptian Architecture, (DÖAW 33), Wien 2005, pp. 531–538.
- "Archaeological Remarks on the 4th and 5th Dynasty Chronology", Archiv Orientální, Volume 69: 2001, pp. 363–418 Archived
- "Contemporaneous Evidence for the Relative Chronology of Dyns. 4 and 5" in Ancient Egyptian Chronology, (eds: Erik Hornung, Rolf Krauss, and David A. Warburton) Brill, Leiden 2006, pp. 124–143
- "The system of dating in the Old Kingdom" in Chronology and Archaeology in Ancient Egypt (The Third Millennium B.C.), (eds) Hana Vymazalovâ & Miroslav Barta, Charles University in Prague 2008. pp. 23-43 Archived
- "Vis à Vis a Young Pharaoh", Anthropologie, Volume: LVI No. 2, 2018, pp. 85–90 Archived
