= List of finds in Egyptian pyramids =

List of finds in the substructures or interiors of Egyptian pyramids that have been explored and still contained notable findings in modern times. An absence of documented finds does not imply nothing was ever found.

Pyramids not listed have either not been located or explored (e.g.: due to flooding or collapse), have no substructure, were fully looted, or contained nothing of note.

Dyn	Pyramid names	Sarcophagi / Coffins	Human remains	Canopic jars and chests	Wall Decorations	Other noteworthy finds, sources
Old Kingdom
3rd	Pyramid of Djoser	Square granite vault	Mummy parts (later burial)		Gallery: 3 false doors with faience tiles, inscribed door frames	
3rd	Eastern shafts and galleries	2 alabaster sarcophagi, fragments of others	Hip bone of a young woman, set of female remains predating Djoser		Undecorated	Seal impression of Djoser's Horus name, 40,000 stone vessels (primarily alabaster), most made before Djoser
3rd	Buried Pyramid	Alabaster sarcophagus (with side opening)			Undecorated	Bark and decomposed wood found on top of sarcophagus
4th	Meidum Pyramid	Pieces of wooden coffin			Undecorated	Cedar logs embedded in masonry
4th	Bent Pyramid				Undecorated	Wood plank still holding back blocking stone, cedar logs
4th	Red Pyramid		Fragments of human remains		Undecorated	
4th	Great Pyramid of Giza	Granite sarcophagus, lid missing			Undecorated	Queen's Chamber Air-Shafts: diorite ball, copper "hook", cedar plank Relieving Chambers: Hieroglyphic graffiti - incl. Khufu's names spelled out multiple times
4th	Queen's pyramid GI-a	Recess for sarcophagus, basalt fragments	Pieces of bone		Undecorated	
4th	Queen's pyramid GI-b	Broken wood coffins (later burials)	12 or 13 skulls, bones (later burials)		Undecorated	Bronze armlet, with a piece of brown stone shaped like part of a female hand
4th	Pyramid of Djedefre					Inscribed stone fragments, copper axe blade, worker graffiti including Djedefre's cartouche
4th	Queen's pyramid	Limestone sarcophagus fragments		2 lids possibly from canopic jars	Undecorated	Large alabaster vessel, pottery fragments, faience tiles, large Egyptian alabaster plate inscribed with the Horus name of Khufu (Djedefre's father)
4th	Pyramid of Khafre	Granite sarcophagus with lid		Pit for canopic chest	Undecorated	Bull bones found inside sarcophagus (probably later addition)
4th	Subsidiary pyramid				Undecorated	Wooden shrine (nah netjer) in niche that had been ritually destroyed.
4th	Pyramid of Menkaure	Basalt sarcophagus with palace facade; Later burial: wooden anthropoid coffin inscribed with Menkaure's name	Bones of a woman with pieces of clothing (later burial)		Paneled chamber: stylized false door motifs, lintel in reed-mat form	
4th	Queen's pyramid GIII-a	Granite sarcophagus			Undecorated	Pieces of pottery
4th	Queen's pyramid GIII-b	Granite sarcophagus	Jawbone of a young woman, fragments of bones		Undecorated	Decayed wood, roof slab inscription containing cartouche of Menkaure
5th	Pyramid of Userkaf	Basalt sarcophagus fragments			Undecorated	
5th	Pyramid of Sahure	Basalt sarcophagus fragments			Undecorated	
5th	Pyramid of Khentkaus II	Granite sarcophagus fragments			Undecorated	Mummy wrappings, alabaster pottery
5th	Pyramid of Neferefre	Granite sarcophagus fragments	6 pieces of mummified remains of a young man (incl. hand, clavicle, fibula)	Pieces of 4 canopic jars	Undecorated	Alabaster pottery
5th	Lepsius XXIV Pyramid	Granite sarcophagus fragments	Damaged mummy of a young woman	Alabaster canopic jars	Undecorated	Remains of burial equipment: models of alabaster vessels. copper tools used for the ritual of the opening of the mouth ritual
5th?	Double Pyramid (east)		Scanty remains of a female burial	Fragments of limestone, canopic jars	Undecorated	Model vessels of alabaster, model chisels of copper and shards of pottery.
5th?	Double Pyramid (west)		Tiny fragments of a female burial		Undecorated	Remnants of the burial equipment, a model vessel of alabaster, several corroded model vessels and instruments of copper.
5th	Headless Pyramid	Broken sarcophagus lid			Undecorated	
5th	Pyramid of Djedkare Isesi	Basalt sarcophagus fragments	Mummified remains of an old man	Niche for canopic chest	Undecorated	Broken pottery, faience bead on a gold filament
5th	Pyramid of Unas	Greywacke sarcophagus	Mummied remains of a human (incl. right arm, left hand, skull and shinbone)		Pyramid Texts, rich deorations	Wooden handles of two knives
6th	Pyramid of Teti	Greywacke sarcophagus with inscriptions on the inside	Mummified remains of a human (incl. arm and shoulder blade)	Canopic jar containing viscera	Pyramid Texts	Club heads inscribed with the pharaoh's name
6th	Queen's pyramid of Iput (mastaba transformed to pyramid by Pepi I)	Cedar coffin in limestone sarcophagus	Iput's intact remains	5 crude canopic jars	Pyramid Texts	Jewelry on mummy, model vessels of alabaster, pottery and copper, alabaster slabs inscribed with names of sacred oils, model gilded copper tools
6th	Pyramid of Pepi I	Inscribed black stone sarcophagus	Mummy fragment	Granite canopic chest, 1 intact alabaster canopic jar and fragments of others, viscera	Pyramid Texts	Sandal (of Pepi), flint knife, inscribed linen, 2 fragments of a thin gold plate (the body rested on), 2 scraps of a loincloth
6th	Queen's pyramid of Nebuunet	Granite sarcophagus fragments				Cylindrical wooden weight, wooden ostrich feather, inscribed alabaster tablets
6th	Queen's pyramid of Inenek-Inti	Greywacke sarcopagus				Pottery
6th	Western pyramid	Granite sarcophagus fragments				Wooden weights, ostrich feathers, copper fish hooks, fired-clay vessels
6th	Queen's pyramid of Pyramid of Meritites IV	Geywacke sarcophagus fragments			Queen's titulary on hallway walls	Wooden fragments inscribed with formulas of the pyramid texts
6th	Queen's pyramid of Ankhesenpepi II	Basalt sarcophagus with inscribed titulary	Bone fragments of the arm, leg and foot of adult woman		Pyramid Texts	
6th	Queen's pyramid of Ankhesenpepi III	Sandstone Sarcophagus with Granite Lid, inscribed with name and titulary	Bone fragments		Palace facade decoration	
6th	Queen's pyramid of Behenu	Sarcophagus fragments			Inscribed and decorated	
6th	Pyramid of Merenre	Basalt sarcophagus with lid and traces of gilding	Mummy of young man (possibly later burial)	Granite canopic chest with lid	Pyramid Texts	2 alabaster vessels
6th	Pyramid of Pepi II	Greywacke sarcophagus with lid, inscribed with Pepi II's titulary		Granite canopic chest lid, niche for chest	Pyramid Texts, niche pattern, false doors topped with King's name	Mummy wrappings, fragments of alabaster and diorite vases, golden spatula
6th	Queen's pyramid of Neith	Granite sarcophagus		Granite canopic chest	Pyramid Texts, starred ceiling	Descending passage: granite false door, burial chamber: miniature (inscribed) bronze tableware, stone vases
6th	Queen's pyramid of Neith					Fragments of pottery, 3 alabaster vessels
6th	Queen's pyramid of Iput II (and Ankhesenpepi IV)	Granite sarcophagus of Queen Ankhesenpepi IV inscribed with Annals of the 6th dynasty			Pyramid Texts	
6th	Queen's pyramid of Udjebten				Pyramid Texts	
Dyn	Pyramid names	Sarcophagi / Coffins	Human remains	Canopic jars and chests	Wall Decorations	Other noteworthy finds, sources
First Intermediate Period
8th	Pyramid of Qakare Ibi	Granite monolith once held sarcophagus			Pyramid Texts	
Middle Kingdom
11th	Pyramid of Reherishefnakht	Sarcophagus inscribed with Coffin Texts			Pyramid Texts	
12th	Queen's pyramid 3 of Senusret I	Quartzite sarcophagus, remains of gilded, wooden Coffin	Bone fragments	Broken but complete canopic chest	Undecorated	Deteriorated wooden staff
12th	Pyramid of Senusret II	Granite sarcophagus	Leg bones		Undecorated	Alabaster offering table inscribed with the pharaoh's name, gold uraeus
12th	Pyramid of Senusret III	Granite sarcophagus with palace facade			Undecorated	Pottery vases, broken bronze dagger with ivory handle
12th	Queen's pyramid of Nofrethenut	2 sarcophagi, one inscribed with titulary			Undecorated	
12th	Queen's pyramid of Itakayt	Sarcophagus		Canopic chest, two canopic jars	Undecorated	
12th	Pyramid of Amenemhat III (Dashur)	Decorated granite sarcophagus	Chambers for queens (or daughters): 6 mummies found total	Unused canopic chest for the king	Undecorated	(Substructure was collapsing, pyramid not used for the king)
12th	Burial chamber of Aat	Sarcophagus	Mummy of Aat	Canopic chest, 1 canopic jar	Undecorated	2 mace heads, 7 duck-shaped alabaster cases, alabaster unguent jar, pieces of jewelry
12th	Burial chamber of Chenmetneferhedjet	Sarcophagus	Mummy of Chenmetneferhedjet		Undecorated	
12th	Burial chamber of unknown queen				Undecorated	Obsidian vase with gold bands, 3 duck-shaped alabaster vessels, granite and alabaster mace heads, jewelry
12th	Pyramid of Amenemhat III (Hawara)	Quartzite sarcophagus	Bone fragments	2 canopic chests	Undecorated	Alabaster offering table, duck-shaped bowls in baring the name of his Amenemhat III's Queen Neferu-ptah
12th	Southern Mazghuna pyramid	Granite sarcophagus			Undecorated	3 limestone lamps, duck-shaped alabaster vessel
12th	Northern Mazghuna pyramid	Quartzite sarcophagus			Undecorated	
Second Intermediate Period
13th	Pyramid of Ameny Qemau	Great quartzite monolith with separate cavities for the mummy, and the canopic equipment		4 broken calcite canopic jars inscribed with the pharaoh's name	Undecorated	
13th	Tomb S9	Quartzite sarcophagus			Undecorated	Burned wood, burned bandages, small pieces of inscribed, gilded plaster from the king's mummy mask, and pieces of unburnt wood and faience inlay, stone jars, beads, and bone needles
13th	Tomb S10	Quartzite sarcophagus, found in a later royal tomb in the same necropolis (tomb CS6)			Undecorated	Planks from the cedar coffin, reused by king Senebkay into a canopic box for his own neighboring burial (tomb CS9)

== Gallery ==
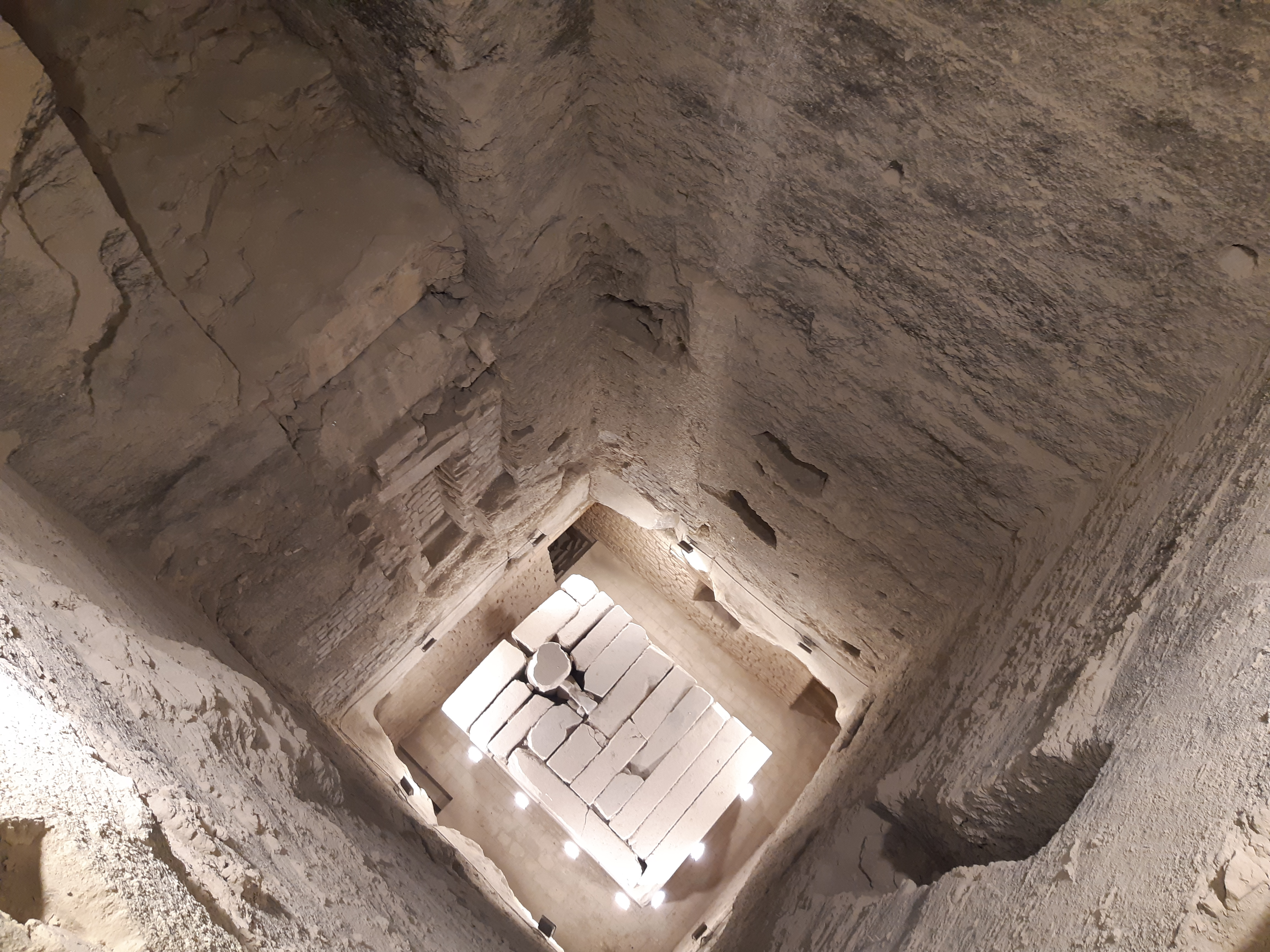
Djoser's burial chamber

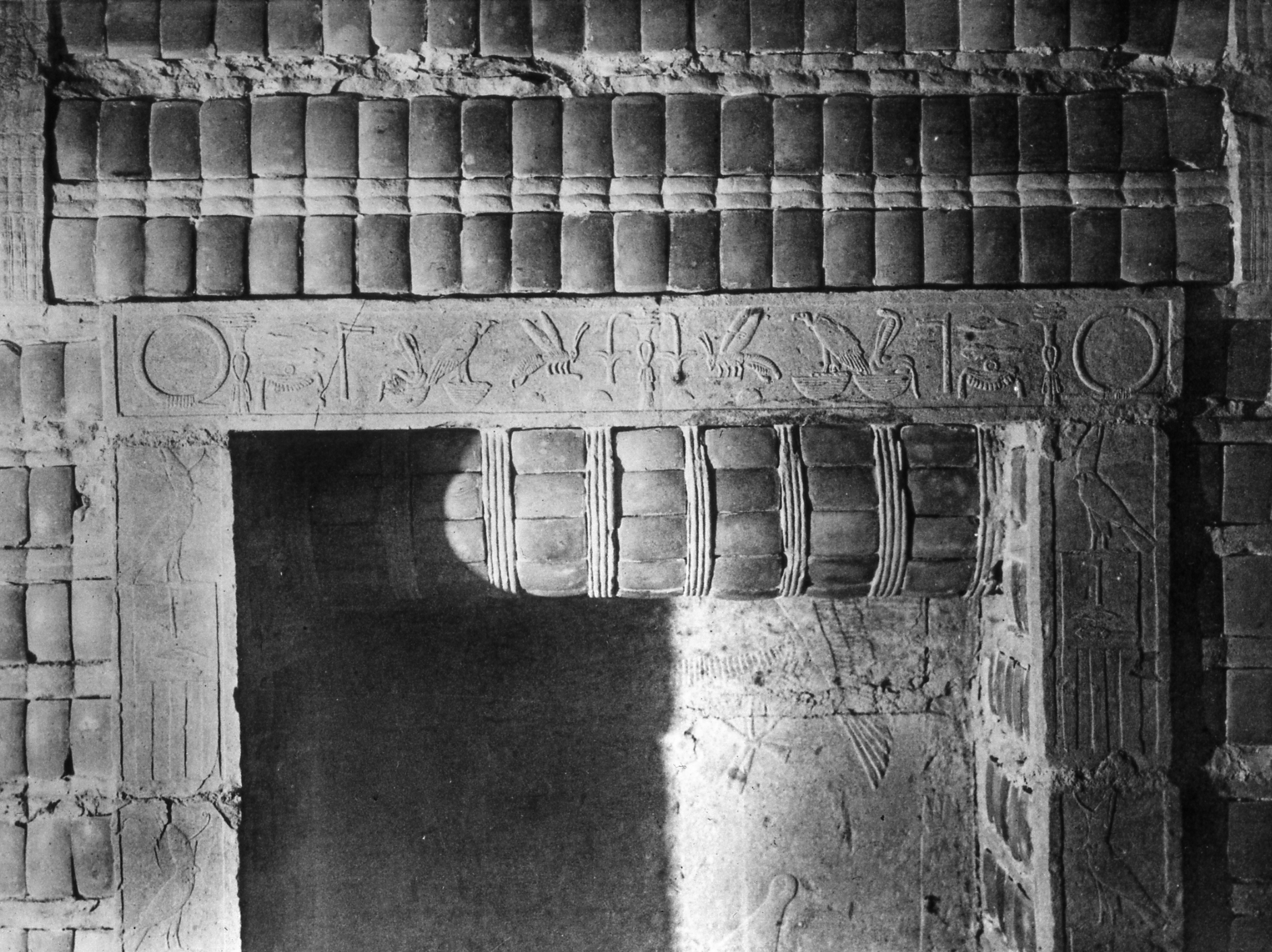
Djoser's Pyramid: Gallery Decorations

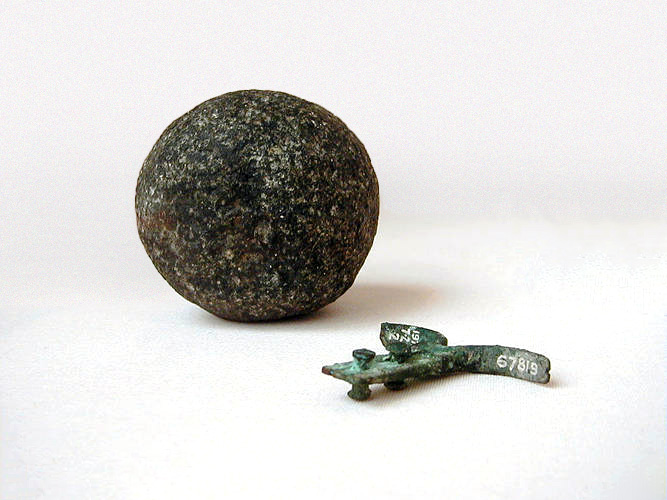
Diorite ball and copper "hook" found in the Great Pyramid of Giza

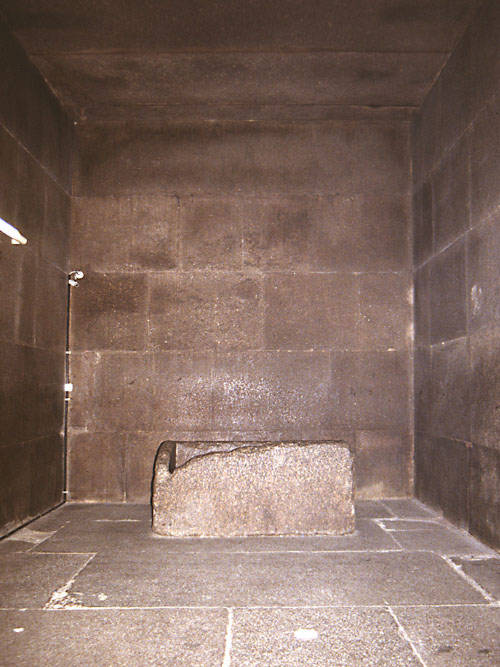
Sarcophagus of Khufu

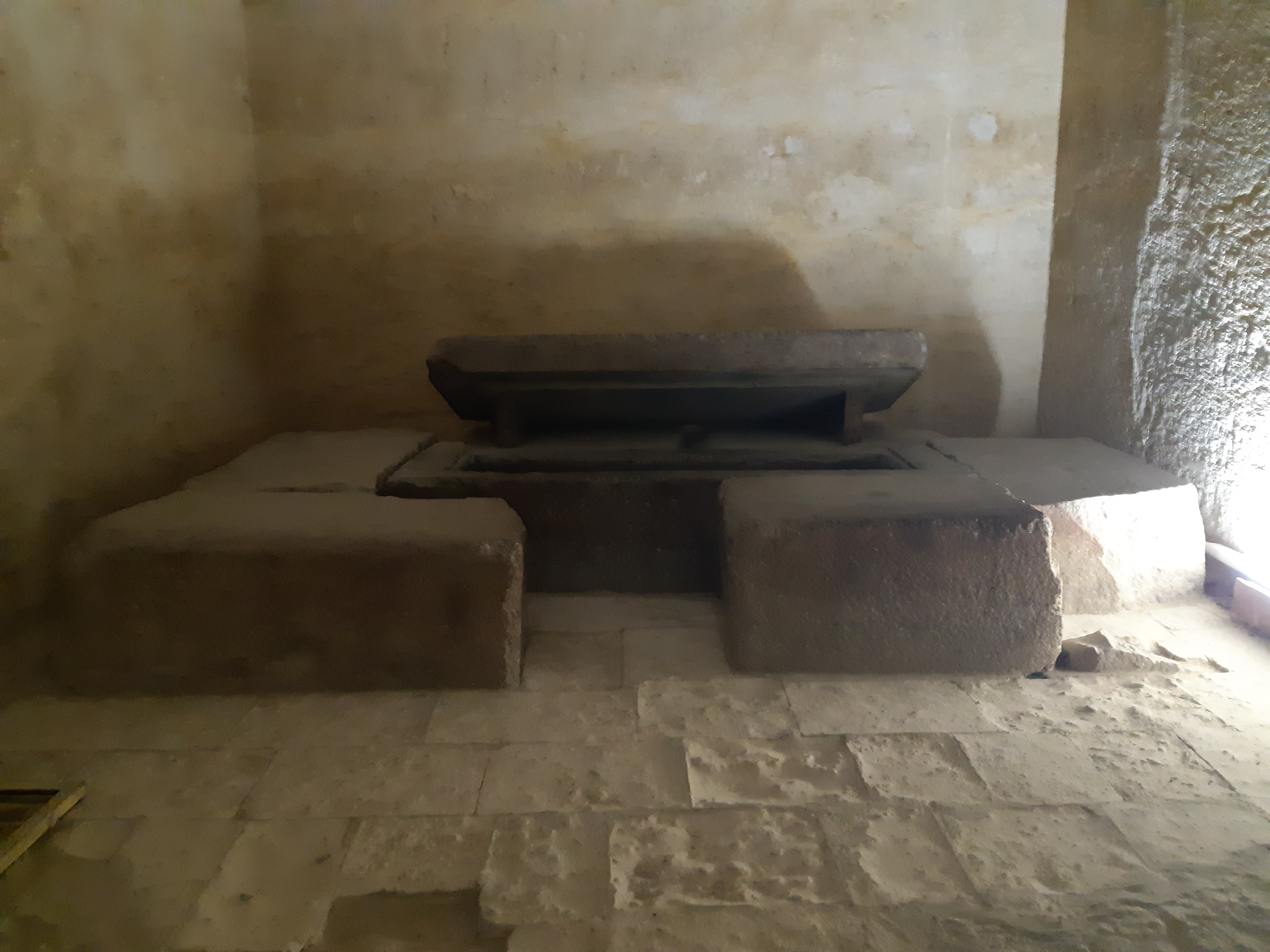
Sarcophagus of Khafre

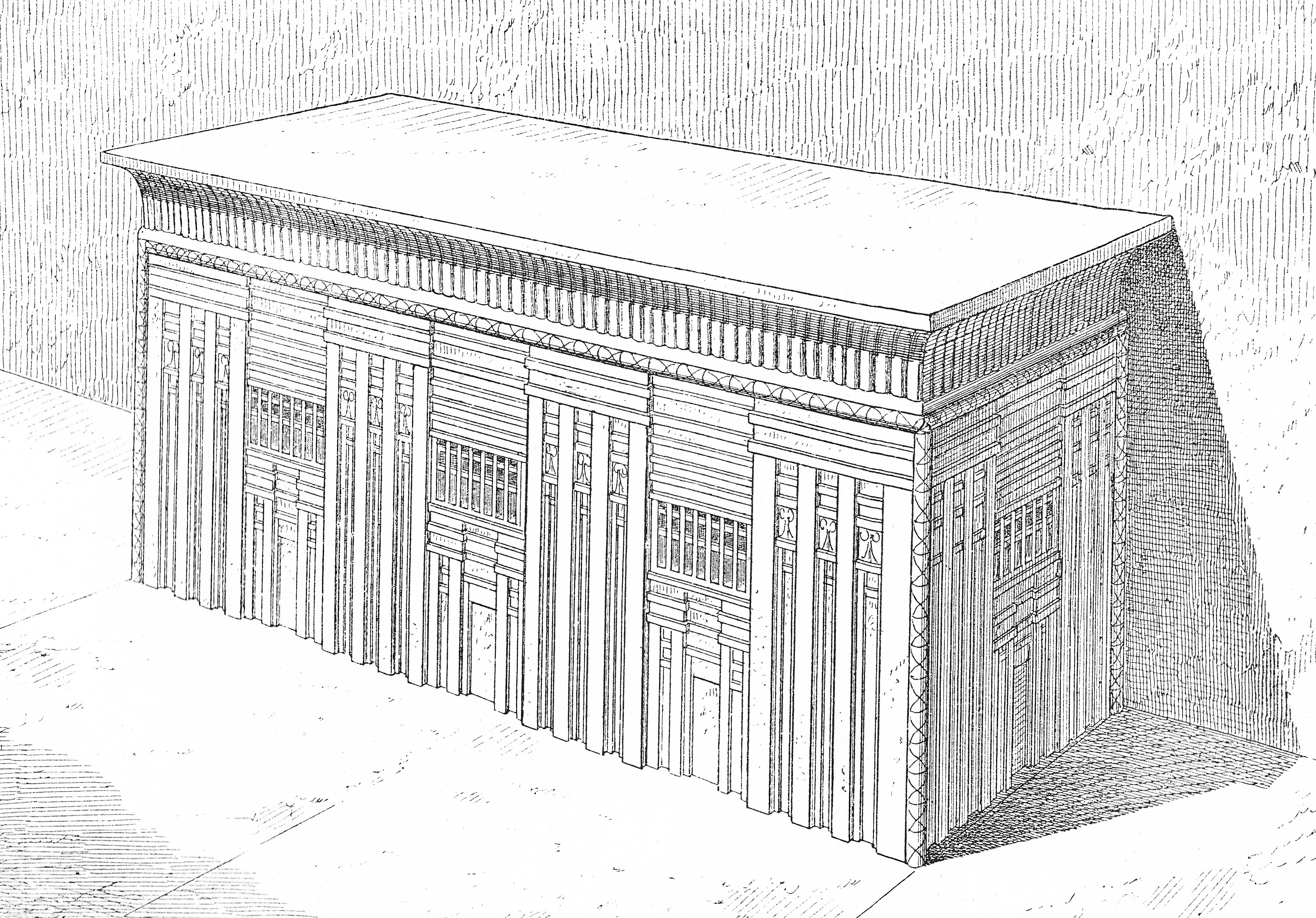
Sarcophagus of Menkaure

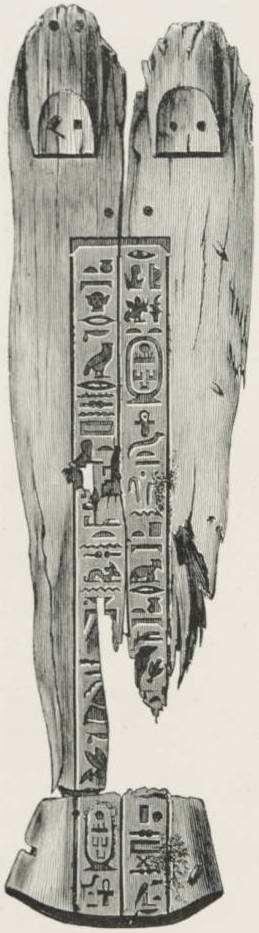

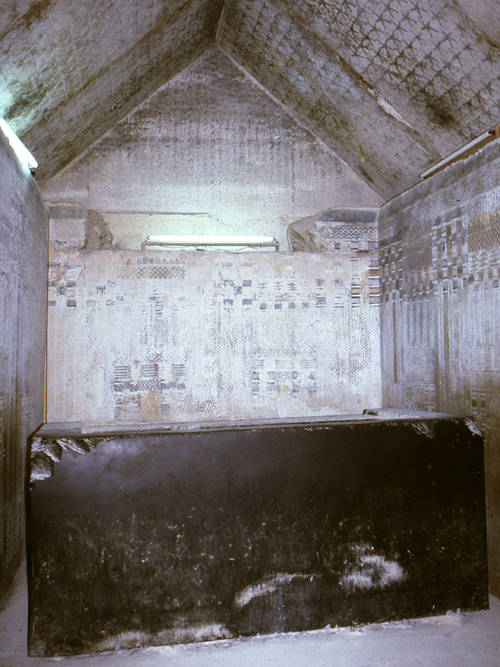
Burial chamber of Unas

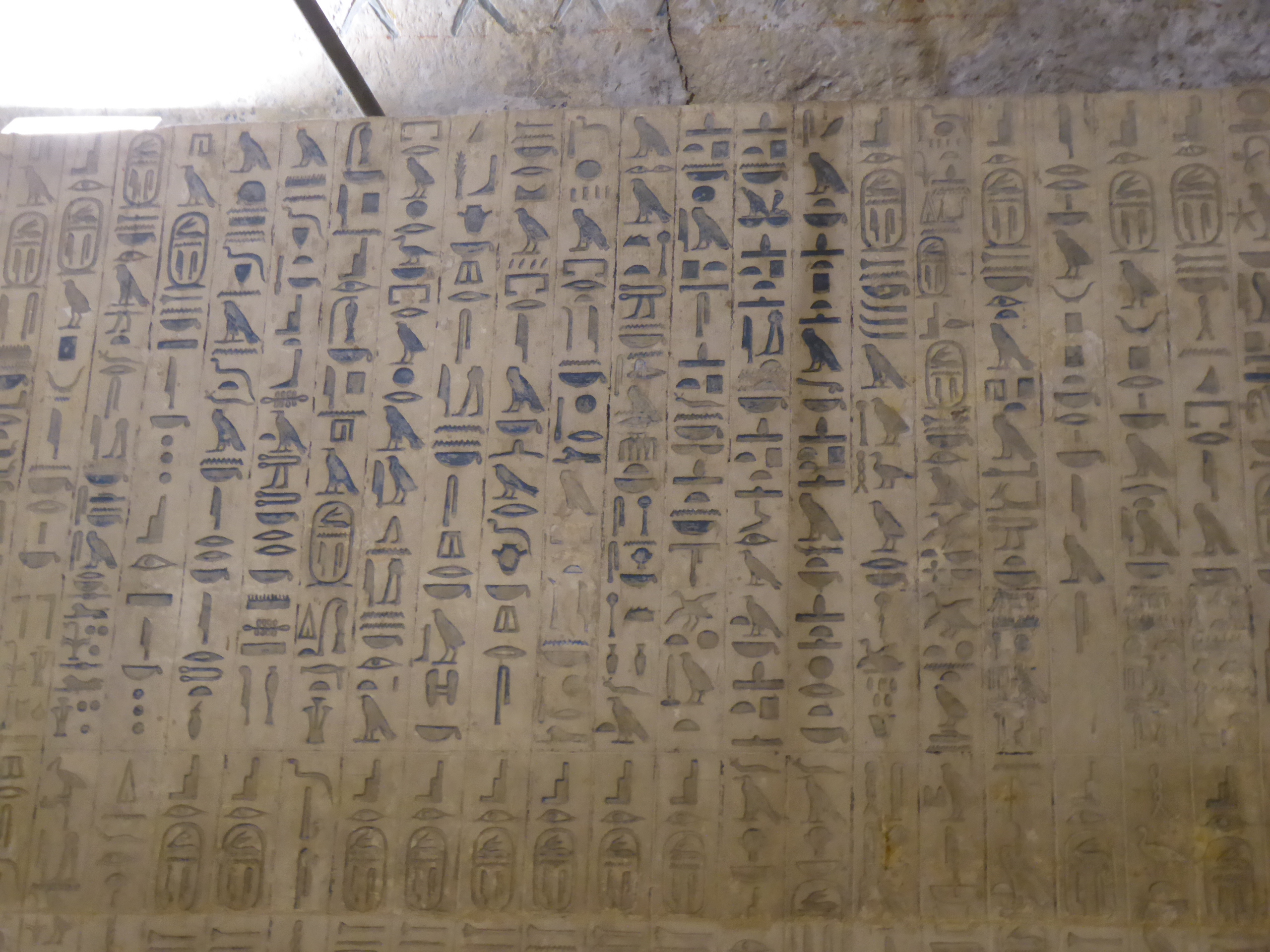
Unas: Pyramid Texts

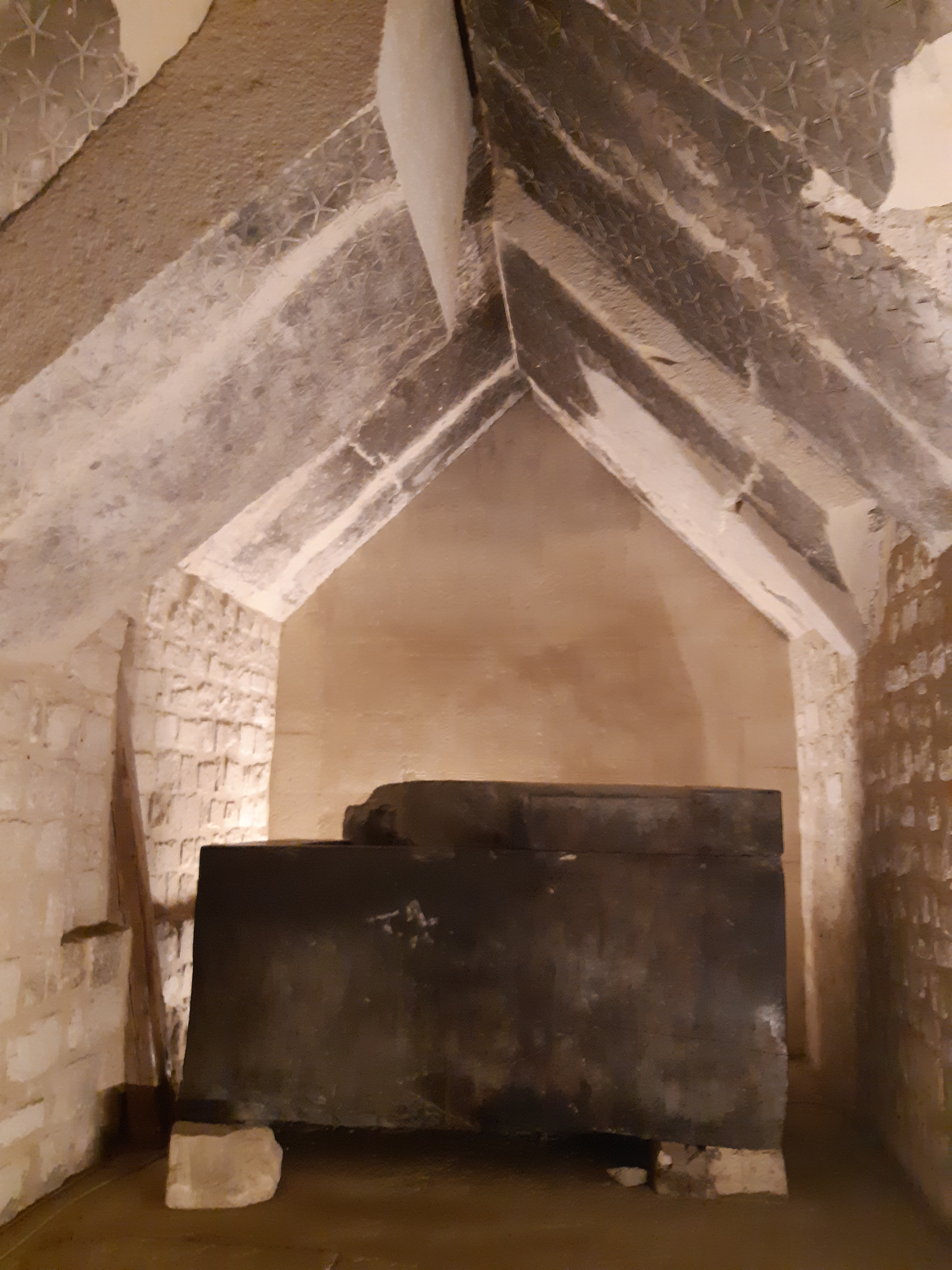
Burial chamber of Teti

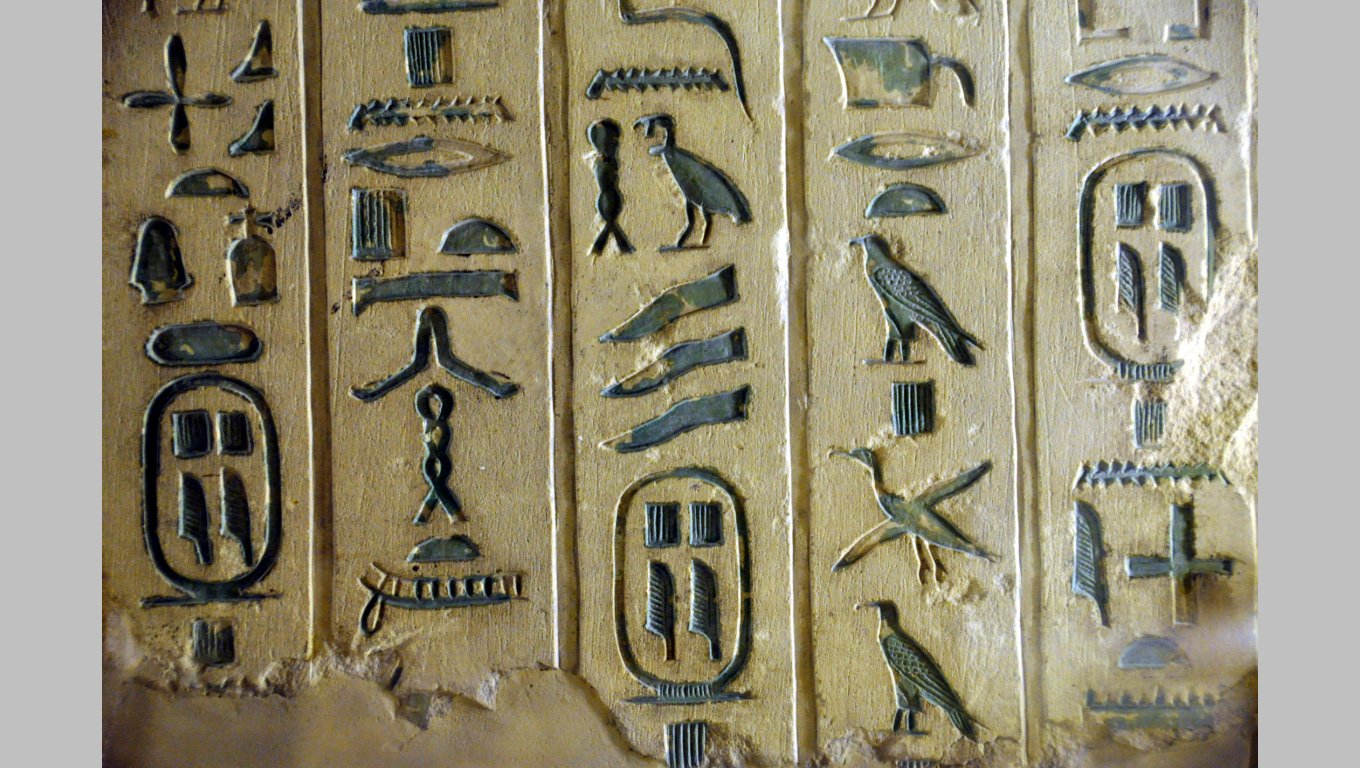
Pepi I Pyramid Texts

== See also ==
- Ancient Egyptian funerary practices
- Ancient Egyptian funerary texts
- List of pharaohs
- Pyramid Texts
- Sarcophagus

== Bibliography ==
- Lehner, Mark (1997). The Complete Pyramids. London: Thames and Hudson. ISBN 0-500-05084-8.
- Vyse, Howard (1840). Operations carried on at the pyramids of Gizeh in 1837. Vol. 2. London: James Fraser.
- McCormack, Dawn (2006). "Borrowed Legacy, Royal Tombs S9 and S10 at South Abydos" (PDF). Expedition. 48 (2).
- Wegner, J.; Cahail, K. (2015). "Royal Funerary Equipment of a King Sobekhotep at South Abydos: Evidence for the Tombs of Sobekhotep IV and Neferhotep I?". JARCE. 51: 123–164. doi:10.5913/jarce.51.2015.a006.
