= Pyramid of Pepi I =

Pyramid complex in South Saqqara

Coordinates: 29°51′16″N 31°13′8″E

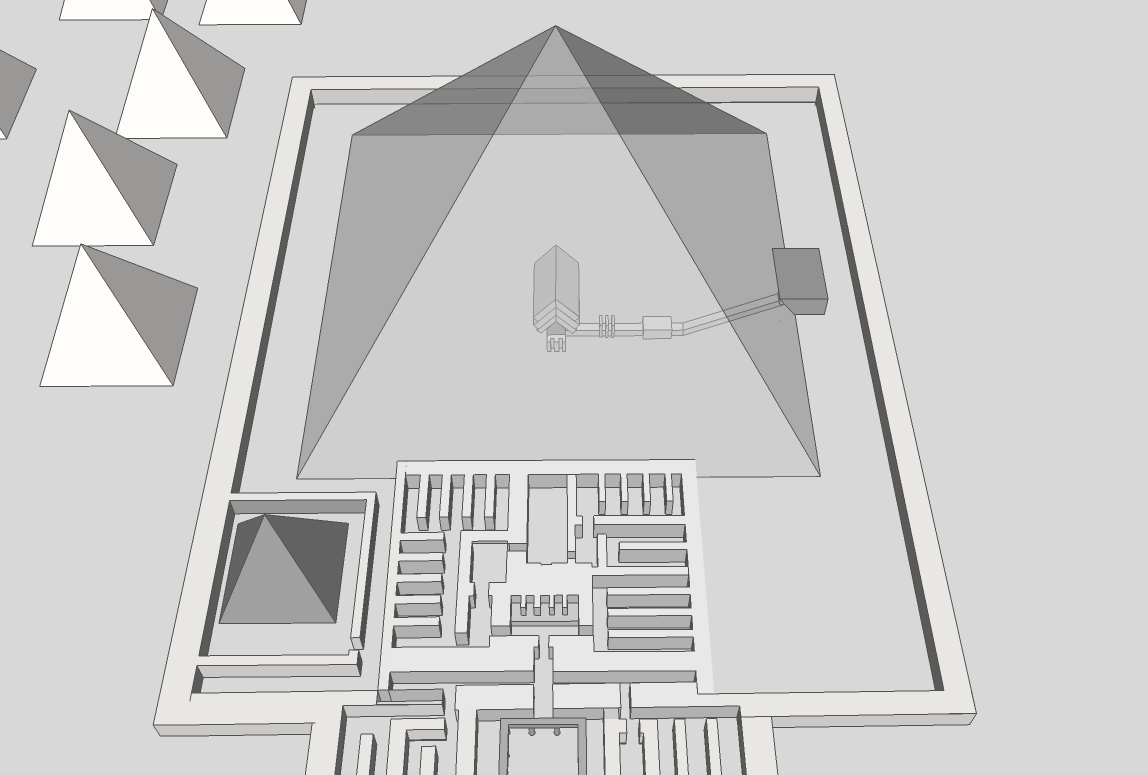
- Plan of the pyramid.

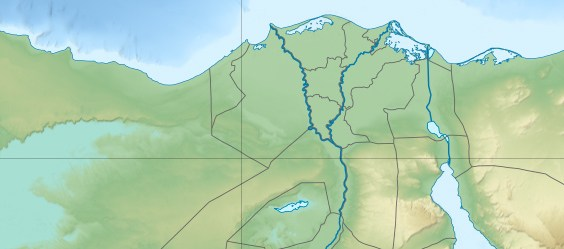
- Location within Lower Egypt
- Owner: Pepi I
Ancient name
< Q3 Q3 M17 M17 > Y5 N35 F35 O24
Mn-nfr Ppy
Men-nefer Pepi
"Pepi's splendor is enduring" Alternatively translated as "The perfection of Pepi is established"
- Architect: Inenek-Inti
- Constructed: Sixth Dynasty (c. 24th/23rd century BC)
- Type: True (now ruined)
- Material: Limestone
- Height: 52.5 m (172 ft; 100.2 cu) (original); 12 m (39 ft; 23 cu) (current)
- Base: 78.75 m (258.4 ft; 150.29 cu)
- Volume: ~ 107,835 m^{3} (141,043 cu yd)
- Slope: 53°7'48''

The pyramid of Pepi I (Egyptian: Mn-nfr Ppy, lit. 'Pepi's splendour is enduring') is the funerary monument built for the Egyptian pharaoh Pepi I of the Sixth Dynasty in the 24th or 23rd century BC. (Note: Proposed dates for Pepi I's reign: c. 2354–2310 BC, c. 2332–2283 BC, c. 2321–2287 BC, c. 2289–2255 BC, c. 2265–2219 BC. Pepi I is accorded a reign of 50 years in both Manetho's Aegyptiaca and the Turin Canon, and according to the Egyptologist Nicolas Grimal must have reigned for at least 40 years.) The complex lent its name to the ancient capital city of Egypt, Memphis. As in the pyramids of his predecessors, Pepi I's substructure was filled with vertical columns of hieroglyphic texts: Pyramid Texts. It was in Pepi I's pyramid that these texts were initially discovered in 1880 by Gaston Maspero, though they originated in the pyramid of Unas. The corpus of Pepi I's texts is also the largest from the Old Kingdom, comprising 2,263 columns and lines of hieroglyphs.

Pepi I sited his pyramid complex in South Saqqara, approximately 2.4 km (1.5 mi) north of Djedkare Isesi's pyramid. It is unclear why he relocated to South Saqqara, but perhaps he had moved the royal palace south and away from the city, or no viable sites remained in North and Central Saqqara after Teti built his pyramid there. Pepi I entrusted one of his wives, Inenek-Inti, with the construction of the funerary monument. The pyramid and substructure replicated the basic design of Djedkare Isesi's and is proportionally very similar. The pyramid has been severely damaged and is now a small ruinous mound. The mortuary temple suffered extensive damage from stone thieves, but the work carried out by the Mission archéologique française de Saqqâra/Mission archéologique franco-suisse de Saqqâra (MAFS) has revealed that the temple was laid out in near exactly the same manner as his predecessor's. Excavation work at the causeway has only extended out to a few metres, and the valley temple and pyramid town remain unexcavated.

The most significant finds at the complex are the queens' pyramids. As of 2017, a total of nine pyramids have been discovered south-west of Pepi I's complex. These pyramids belong to Nebuunet, Inenek-Inti, Meritites IV, Ankhesenpepi II, Ankhesenpepi III, Mehaa with a tomb belonging to her son Hornetjerikhet to its north, Behenu, Reherishefnakht and one, the Western Pyramid, that remains anonymous. The pyramids of Queens Ankhesenpepi II and Behenu also contain Pyramid Texts. The pyramid of Reherishefnakht contains both Pyramid Texts and Coffin Texts. It is significant for two reasons: It is the oldest known pyramid not built for a member of the royal family and its epigraphy links the Old and Middle Kingdoms.

== Location and excavation ==
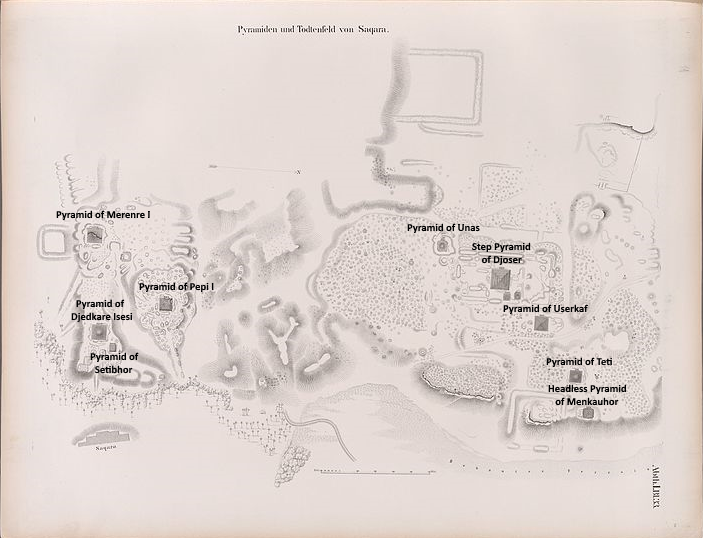
Annotated map of the Saqqara plateau

Pepi I selected a site about 2.4 km (1.5 mi) north of Djedkare's pyramid in South Saqqara. Mark Lehner suggests that siting the pyramid in North or Central Saqqara may not have been possible after Teti built his pyramid there, and that this may be the reason for Pepi I's choice to move to South Saqqara. Jaromír Malek proposes that the "squalor, smell and noise of a crowded city", Djed-Isut to the east of Teti's pyramid, may have caused Djedkare Isesi and Pepi I to relocate their royal palaces further south and that this would explain their siting of their funerary monuments at South Saqqara.

The pyramid was first examined by John Shae Perring in the 1830s. In 1880, Gaston Maspero, director of the French Institute for Oriental Archaeology in Cairo, arrived in Egypt. He selected a site in South Saqqara, a mound that had been previously mapped by Karl Richard Lepsius, for his first archaeological dig. Here he found the ruins of a large structure which he identified as the pyramid of Pepi I. During the excavations he was able to gain access to the substructure where he discovered that the walls were covered in hieroglyphic text – the Pyramid Texts. This was the first pyramid in which texts were found. Maspero also found texts in the pyramids of Unas, Teti, Merenre I, and Pepi II in 1880–1. He published his findings in Les inscriptions des pyramides de Saqqarah in 1894.

MAFS has been leading efforts at the site of Pepi I's pyramid since 1950. Jean-Philippe Lauer and Jean Sainte-Fare Garnot led the efforts until 1963, and since then the site has been under the supervision of Jean Leclant and Audran Labrousse. Under Jean Leclant's supervision, a "major architectural and epigraphic project" was undertaken in the pyramids of Unas, Teti, Pepi I, and Merenre I. In 1966, the burial chamber and passageway of the substructure in Pepi I's pyramid were unearthed. It was revealed that the texts in Pepi I's pyramid were engraved and painted in a shade of green, referred to by ancient Egyptians as wadj, that symbolized "renewal and germination".

The south face and wall and a section of the east face of the pyramid were excavated between March and April 1996. A wealth of inscribed limestone blocks were also uncovered. They bear the names of individuals involved with the construction of the complex, and their recovery is significant because they would typically be hidden by the encasement. From these inscriptions it was worked out that family members of the pharaoh were involved in the project. Teti-ankh, a son of Teti according to Vassil Dobrev, managed various activities around the complex. His name is particularly associated with the enclosure wall and measurement taking. Inenek-Inti, a wife of Pepi I, appears on multiple blocks inscribed with titles indicating her role as the architect and builder of the monument. More inscribed limestone blocks were uncovered in the period between February and April 1997. Over the course of the years 1995 to 1997, all four sides of the pyramid were cleared, and hundreds of blocks recording the involvement of about forty individuals discovered.

== Mortuary complex ==
Old Kingdom mortuary complexes consisted of five essential components: (1) a valley temple; (2) a causeway; (3) a pyramid, or mortuary, temple; (4) a cult, or satellite, pyramid; and (5) the main pyramid. Pepi I's complex comprises: a main pyramid constructed of six steps of limestone encased in fine white limestone; a mortuary temple that near exactly replicates those of his predecessors, with a cult pyramid to its south; and a valley temple and causeway that have not been excavated. Pepi I's pyramid complex, Men-nefer Pepi, lent its name to the ancient capital city of Egypt, Men-nefer (Memphis).

=== Main pyramid ===
The pyramid was constructed in the same fashion as others since Djedkare Isesi's reign: a core was built six steps high using small limestone blocks bound together with clay mortar, and then encased with fine white limestone blocks. The limestone casing has been stripped away for the production of lime, and is intact only at the lowest steps. A fragmentary inscription found by MAFS in 1993 belonging to Khaemwaset, High Priest of Memphis and son of Ramesses II, from the Nineteenth Dynasty indicates that the pyramid was in relatively good condition at this time, needing only minor improvements.

The pyramid is now destroyed, and original dimensions are estimates. The length of the base of the pyramid was 78.75 m (258 ft; 150 cu), converging towards the apex at ~53° giving the pyramid a peak 52.5 m (172 ft; 100 cu) high on completion. The remaining ruins leave a mound about 12 m (39 ft; 23 cu) tall, with a pit in its centre dug by stone robbers.

=== Substructure ===
A north chapel once stood over the entrance corridor on the north face of the pyramid. This leads into a descending corridor built from limestone. The corridor terminates at a vestibule that leads into the horizontal passage. Midway along the horizontal passage is the main barrier of three pink granite portcullises. The passage is further reinforced with granite in three places. The layout of the chambers in Pepi I's pyramid are the same as those in his predecessor's pyramids: the antechamber sits on the pyramid's vertical axis, with a room containing three recesses – called the serdab – to its east, and the burial chamber to its west. The ante- and burial- chambers had gabled roofs made from limestone blocks set three layers deep with sixteen blocks in each layer. The ceiling is estimated to have weighed around five thousand tons.

The ceiling was painted with white stars, oriented to the west, against a black background. A sarcophagus was found on the west wall of the burial chamber; though examination indicates that this was a substitute sarcophagus, not the original. Labrousse suggests that the original was either damaged during transportation, or otherwise contained flaws that were later revealed. MAFS made a rare discovery while conducting restorative work in the chamber: a pink granite canopic chest, sunk into a niche at the foot of the sarcophagus, along with a bundle of viscera, once contained inside an alabaster jar and retaining its shape, presumed to belong to the king. The provenance of a mummy fragment and fine linen wrappings found in the burial chamber are unknown, but are hypothesized to belong to Pepi I. Other components of burial equipment found in the chamber are: fragments of canopic vessels made from yellowish alabaster; a sandal made from reddish, possibly sycamore, wood; a small flint knife; some pleated linen; and a fragment of linen bearing the inscription "Linen for the king of Upper and Lower Egypt, may he live forever".

The walls of Pepi I's antechamber, burial chamber, and corridor were inscribed with vertical columns of green painted hieroglyphic text. The corridor texts in Pepi I's pyramid are the most extensive, covering the whole horizontal passage, the vestibule, and even a section of the descending corridor. (Note: Unas' pyramid constrained the texts to the south section of the corridor, as did Teti's. The texts in Merenre I's and Pepi II's pyramids covered the entire corridor and the vestibule.) The serdab was left uninscribed, as it had been in Unas' and Teti's pyramid.

==== Pyramid Texts of Pepi I ====
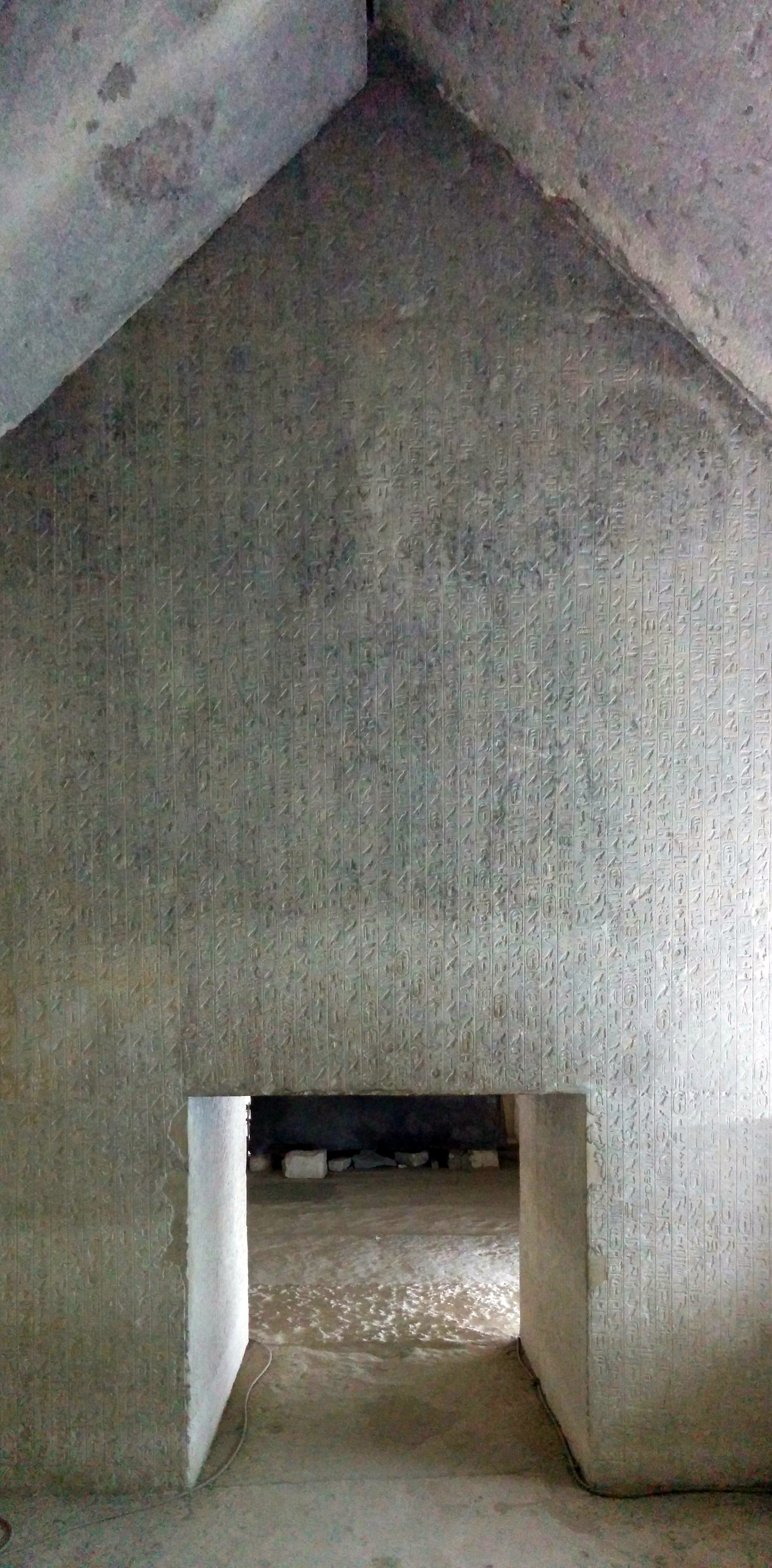
Exemplar of Pyramid Texts from the tomb of Teti

The Pyramid Texts originally appeared in the Pyramid of Unas at the end of the Fifth Dynasty initiating a tradition that carried on in the pyramids of the kings and queens of the Sixth through Eighth Dynasty, until the end of the Old Kingdom. The texts in Pepi I's pyramid, comprising 2,263 columns and lines of text, are the most extensive such corpus of texts from the Old Kingdom. Though the tradition of writing pyramid texts had started in Unas' pyramid, they were originally discovered in Pepi I's pyramid in 1880.

Ancient Egyptian belief held that the individual consisted of three basic parts; the body, the ka, and the ba. When the person died, the ka would separate from the body and return to the gods from where it had come, while the ba remained with the body. The body of the individual, interred in the burial chamber, never physically left; but the ba, awakened, released itself from the body and began its journey toward new life. Significant to this journey was the Akhet: the horizon, a junction between the earth, the sky, and the Duat. To ancient Egyptians, the Akhet was the place from where the sun rose, and so symbolised a place of birth or resurrection. In the texts, the king is called upon to transform into an akh in the Akhet. The akh, literally "effective being", was the resurrected form of the deceased, attained through individual action and ritual performance. If the deceased failed to complete the transformation, they became mutu, that is "the dead". The function of the texts, in congruence with all funerary literature, was to enable the reunion of the ruler's ba and ka leading to the transformation into an akh, and to secure eternal life among the gods in the sky.

Barring the lower section of the western end of the chamber, which is painted in the royal palace facade motif, all four walls of Pepi I's burial chamber were covered in Pyramid Texts. The west wall and gable of Pepi I's burial chamber were inscribed with texts concerned with two themes. The first present Horus in the role of the head-liturgist, and the second involve the presentation of Osiris' corpse to his mother, Nut. These texts are sakhu, meaning "that which makes one into an akh" and serve the "protection, reconstitution, and transfiguration of the king in his sarcophagus". They are flanked – predominantly on the west end of the north wall, but also by two texts in a small register on the west end of the south wall – by texts concerned with the role of Osiris' sisters Isis and Nephthys. On the west end of the south wall, beneath the texts of Isis and Nephythys, are a set of texts dealing with the theme of the king's ascent to the sky.

The remainder of the north wall of the burial chamber is composed of the Offering and Insignia Rituals. Unique to Pepi I's pyramid, the two rituals are clearly delineated in separate registers. The remainder of the south wall of the burial chamber is inscribed with the Resurrection Ritual; these deal with the king's relationship with the gods and his departure from his tomb. Pepi I's version of the ritual begins with a unique, but near entirely lost, spell. Finally, the east wall and gable are inscribed with texts dominated by the relationship between "the ritualist" – in Pepi I's case, his son Merenre I – and Pepi I, and contain occasional personal spells. In the passageway between the burial- and ante- chambers, are a set of four spells inscribed on the north and south walls.

Go back, be far away! Let Horus respect me and Seth protect me.
Go back, be far away! Let Osiris respect me and Kherti protect me.
Go back, be far away! Let Isis respect me and Nephthys protect me.
Be far overhead! Let [Khentiirti] respect me and Thoth protect me.
Go back, be far away! Let those of the nighttime respect me,
and those in old age protect me.
[...]
Should Isis try to come in that bad coming of hers, don’t open your arms to her,
but let there be said to her her identity of Putrid Crotch,
(and say): "Barred! Go to the houses of Manu!
Enough! Go to Hedjbet, to where you will be beaten!"
Should Nephthys try to come in that bad coming of hers,
then let there be said to her her identity of Substitute Who Has No Vulva,
(and say): "Go off to Selket’s enclosures, to where you will be beaten on your haunches!"
[...]
He who shall give his finger against this pyramid
and this god's enclosure of Pepi and of his ka,
he has given his finger against Horus’s Enclosure in the Cool Waters.
Nephthys shall traverse for him every place of his [father] Geb.
His case has been heard by the Ennead and he has nothing, he has no house.
He is one accursed, he is one who eats his own body.
– Pyramid Text 534, north section of the horizontal corridor (Note: This text is exclusive to Pepi I's pyramid. An apotropaic text, its purpose is to ward off malignant gods, assist the king's passage to the sky, and curse anyone who damages and robs the pyramid.)

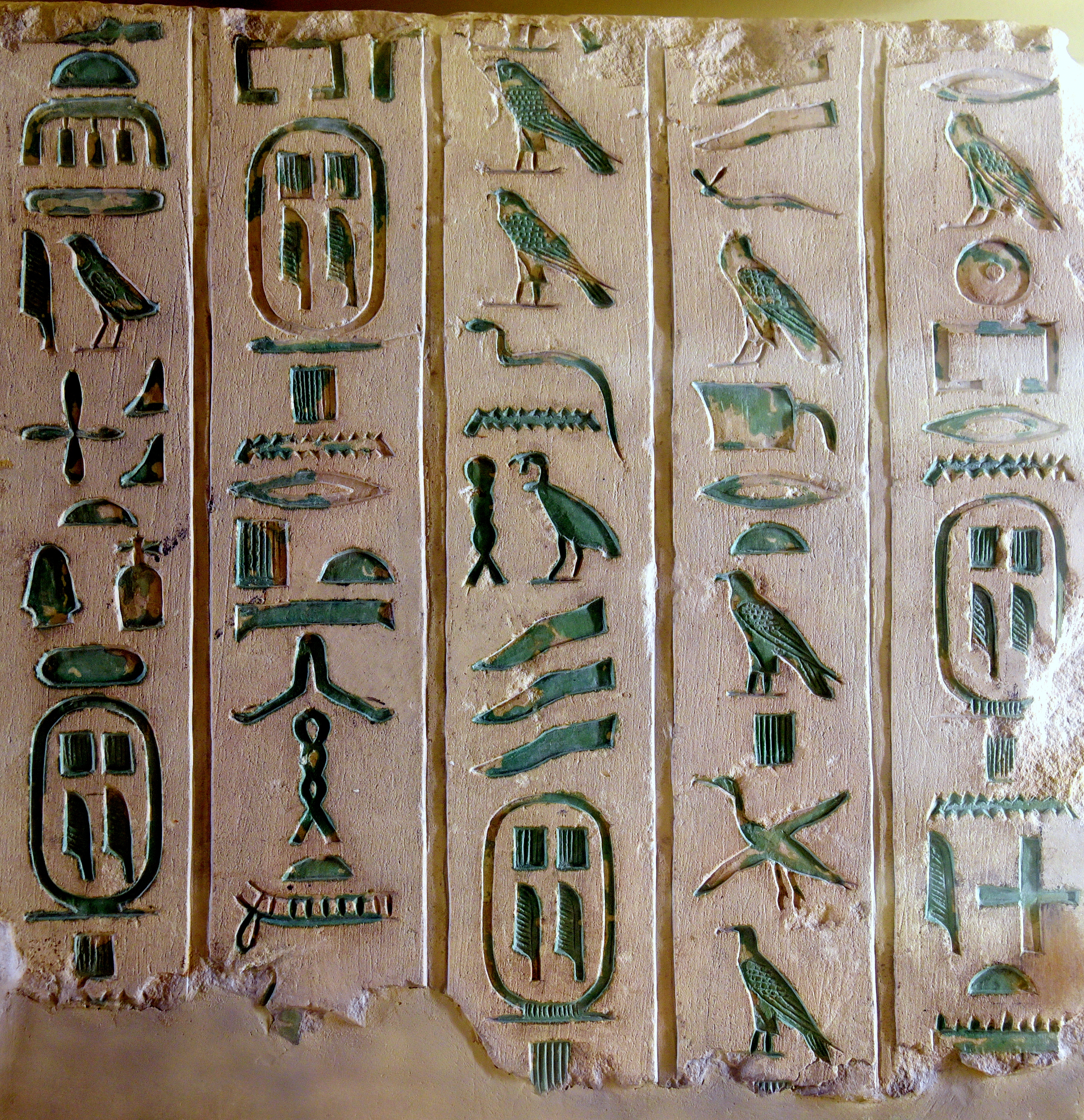
Cartouches of Pepi I and Pyramid Texts. Limestone block fragment from the debris of the north wall of the antechamber within the pyramid of Pepi I at Saqqara. Petrie Museum of Egyptian Archaeology

The west and south walls of the antechamber are inscribed with texts whose core theme revolves around the transition from the human to the celestial realm. The north wall contains two groups of texts: those concerning the king's ascent to the sky, which don't otherwise appear in the antechamber of other pyramids, and those concerned with the king's transformation into Horus. The east wall of the antechamber bears spells that protect and provide for the king. The passage into the serdab is inscribed with the Morning Ritual, but the serdab itself was left uninscribed.

The texts of the horizontal corridor are split into three sections. Their dominant theme is the king's ascent into the sky, alongside other personal texts, a protective spell for the tomb, and a "final imprecation against the guardian of the door" in the north-east section. The vestibule is inscribed on the south, west and east walls. The texts of the south wall generally appear to have been intended to be performed on a statue of the king, with some additional spells allowing the king to open the vestibule's doors. The west and east walls are concerned primarily with the king's ability to pass into and out of the tomb. The north wall remained uninscribed.

Pepi I's descending passage/ascending corridor appears to be the only one to have been inscribed with Pyramid Texts. These are split into two sections, but their full contents are unknown due to the state of damage to the walls. The south end of the west wall has texts relating to the king joining Re in the sky, as does the north end of the east wall, which also has spells for the perpetuation of the king's cult. The south end of the east wall contains provisioning texts. The north end of the west wall has more spells concerned with the king's ascent to the sky.

In addition, it's noted that the inscriptions inside his pyramid were updated at some point near the end of Pepi's reign when he changed his prenomen from Nefersahor (Perfect is the protection of Horus) to Meryre (Beloved of Ra). This late change with Pepi incorporating the sun god Ra's name into his own may reflect some agreement with the influential priesthood of Ra.

=== Valley temple, causeway and pyramid town ===
The valley temple, pyramid town, and the causeway, except for a few metres near to the mortuary temple, have not yet been excavated.

=== Mortuary temple ===
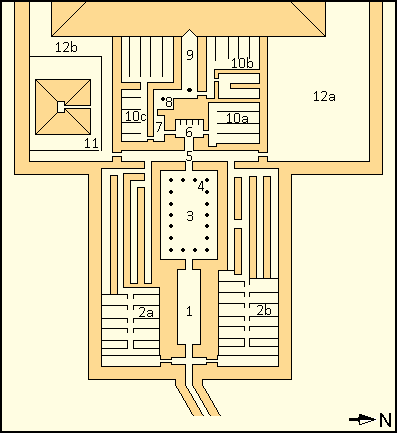
Layout of Pepi I's mortuary temple. In order: 1) Entrance hall with (2a and b) storerooms; 3) Courtyard with (4) columns; 5) Transverse corridor; 6) Five niche statue chapel; 7) Vestibule; 8) Antichambre carrée; 9) Offering hall with (10a-c) storerooms; 11) Cult pyramid; 12a and b) Pyramid courtyard

The mortuary temple has been severely damaged by stone thieves who harvested the limestone used in its construction for lime production, leaving behind a lime furnace that they had set up in the temple grounds. Despite the state of the temple, the archaeological work of MAFS has allowed the plan and features of the temple to be reconstructed. The temple was laid out according to a standard plan that is near exactly like the temples of Djedkare Isesi, Unas, and Teti.

The temple had an entrance hall leading into an open columned courtyard. The hall was flanked by storage magazines to the north and south. The inner temple contained a chapel with five statue niches. It also contained an offering hall and other core chambers. Limestone statues of kneeling captives with hands tied behind their backs were discovered in the south-western section of the inner temple, where they were planned to be thrown into a lime furnace. The statues were broken at the neck and waist. Miroslav Verner states that these statues once lined open columned courtyard, and possibly also the entrance hall, where they served to ward off anyone who threatened the tomb. Jean-Philippe Lauer postulates that the statues once lined the causeway representing the subjugated people of the north and south. Richard Wilkinson notes that the original location of these statues is unknown.

The antichambre carée in Pepi I's temple has been near totally destroyed. An entrance door on its east side has been identified on the basis of granite remains. The room originally had a roof 6.29 m (20.6 ft; 12.00 cu) high. Discoveries inside the room include sections of pavement along with the base of the central column which remained in situ in the chamber's centre. The typical granite column had been replaced with an octagonal pillar. Fragments of the relief decoration were recovered by Labrousse.

=== Cult pyramid ===
The cult pyramid is in a better state of preservation than the mortuary temple. Fragments of statues, stelae and offering tables indicate the continuation of the funerary cult into the Middle Kingdom. In spite of this, the pyramid was falling into ruin by the New Kingdom.

The purpose of the cult pyramid remains unclear. It had a burial chamber but was not used for burials, and instead appears to have been a purely symbolic structure. It may have hosted the pharaoh's ka, or a miniature statue of the king. It may have been used for ritual performances centering around the burial and resurrection of the ka spirit during the Sed festival.

== Queens' pyramids and other significant structures ==
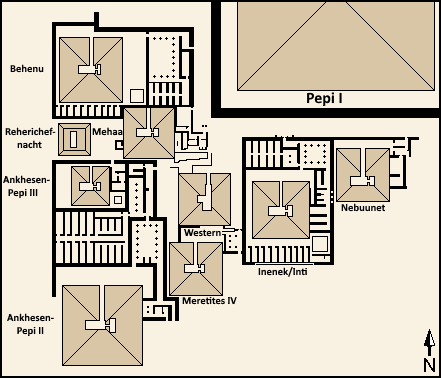
Annotated map of the necropolis south-west of Pepi I's pyramid

The most significant finds at Pepi I's complex are the queens' pyramids. As of 2017, a total of nine pyramids have been discovered in an area to the south-west of Pepi I's pyramid. These pyramids belong to: Nebuunet, Inenek-Inti, Meritites IV, Ankhesenpepi II and Ankhesenpepi III, Mehaa with a tomb belonging to her son Hornetjerikhet to its north, Behenu, Reherishefnakht and one anonymous.

=== Pyramid of Nebuunet ===
Nebuunet was a wife of Pepi I, buried in a pyramid adjacent to his. The complex is the easternmost one so far discovered, and contains a ruined pyramid and small mortuary temple. The pyramid, constructed from limestone, had a base length of about 20.96 m (68.8 ft; 40.00 cu) and a peak height of 21 m (69 ft; 40 cu). Its entrance is set into the pavement of the north chapel and leads into a descending corridor. This transitions into a horizontal passage through a faux vestibule. A single granite portcullis guarded the burial chamber, which was located south of the pyramid's vertical axis. The substructure has the same lay-out as Inenek-Inti's pyramid, with the distinction that her sarcophagus was made of pink granite, rather than greywacke. East of the burial chamber was the serdab which contained fragments of funerary equipment including a cylindrical wooden weight and wooden ostrich feather, potentially representing the feathers of Maat.

The complex is entered through a limestone door facing Pepi I's pyramid. The door has near wholly been reassembled from rediscovered components. Each doorjamb has a complete image of the queen depicting her as a slender woman, wearing a wig that frames her face, equipped with a scabbard and a large necklace dangling around her neck. In one hand she holds a lotus flower breathing in its scent, while the other hangs behind her. Her name and title are inscribed on the doorjambs: "the wife of the king, his beloved, Nebuunet" (l'épouse du roi, son aimée, Noubounet). On the upper part of the jamb, beneath the hieroglyph for sky, a royal falcon with spread wings clutches an ankh pointed at a cartouche bearing Pepi I's name, itself part of a unit of three columns of text.

The limestone door of the complex leads into an antechamber from which the courtyard surrounding the pyramid, and a small mortuary temple of the east face of the pyramid, could be accessed. The temple is in complete ruins, except for the offering hall and a section of wall about 1 m (3.3 ft) thick, which have been better preserved. North of the offering hall was a chapel with three niches. Inside the hall, fragments of sculptures depict the queen on a podium with lions facing a goddess holding a was scepter and the ankh sign. Very little of the relief decoration of the temple has been preserved.

=== Pyramid of Inenek-Inti ===
Inenek-Inti was a wife and vizier of Pepi I, buried in a pyramid adjacent to his. The pyramid had a base length of 21 m (69 ft; 40 cu), converging towards the apex at ratio of 1:2 to a peak height of 21 m (69 ft; 40 cu). The base area of Inenek-Inti's pyramid is thus 1/14th that of Pepi I's pyramid, and its volume 1/10th. In contrast, both her pyramid and its mortuary temple are larger than that belonging to Nebuunet to the east. Inenek-Inti's pyramid is enclosed by a perimeter wall 1.5 m (4.9 ft) thick.

Entrance into the pyramid is gained at a small entrance chapel on its north face. The entry leads into a short descending passage which terminates at a vestibule opening onto the main corridor. The corridor, guarded by a single granite portcullis, leads towards the burial chamber under the pyramid's vertical axis. To the east of the burial chamber is a serdab. On the west side of the burial chamber is a greywacke sarcophagus. The chamber is in ruins, and only fragments of funerary equipment have been preserved: pieces of stone hardware in various colours, and containers with limestone covers meant to protect funerary provisions.

The mortuary temple of the complex is cramped and spreads along the north, east and south sides of the pyramid. Two granite pillars facing north towards the king's pyramid serve as the door into the temple. The pillars are engraved with Inenek-Inti's name, and the queen depicted seated, breathing in the scent of a lotus flower. Two obelisks of gray limestone are present here which depict the queen standing. These too are engraved with her name, one with Inenek and one with Inti. They also bear her titles. The outer temple consists of a hall and a pillared courtyard in the north-east. South of the courtyard, on the east face, were the offering hall and a room containing three statue niches. A group of storerooms flanked these to the north and south. In the south-east corner, was a small cult pyramid. The cult pyramid had a base length of 6 m (20 ft; 11 cu).

=== Western pyramid ===
The identity of this pyramid's owner is preserved on an obelisk in front of her pyramid only as "the eldest daughter of the king". This was the first Queen's pyramid unearthed by MAFS in 1988. The pyramid had a base length of around 20 m (66 ft; 38 cu), the same as Nebuunet's, but the ruins stand a paltry 3 m (9.8 ft; 5.7 cu) tall. Entry into the substructure is gained on the north face. The burial chamber is located under the vertical axis of the pyramid. The location of the serdab is unusual, being to the south of the burial chamber instead of east. Substantial remains of funerary equipment were found inside, but no name: wooden weights and ostrich feathers, copper fish hooks, and fired-clay vessels. It has a hastily built mortuary temple, with an offering hall and a room with two statue niches. Relief fragments discovered depict scenes of processions and estates, along with an incomplete cartouche of Pepi I's name.

=== Pyramid of Meritites IV ===
Meritites IV was a wife of Pepi I, or Pepi II. Her pyramid lies to the south of the anonymous "Western pyramid". It has a base length of 21 m (69 ft; 40 cu) (Note: The MAFS website lists Meretites IV's pyramid as having a base length of 26.2 m (50.0 cu) but then contradicts this with a conversion to 40 cu (21 m). The figure and scale provided indicate less than 25 m (48 cu), so the lower figure is presented in article.) and its substructure is decorated with the titulary of the queen painted halfway up the chamber walls. During the excavation, wood fragments, likely from a box or canopic chest, were discovered with formulas from the Pyramid Texts painted on them. Her identity, image and titles were recorded on in a courtyard with five pillars. In 2007, the pyramid of Meretites IV had been completely restored and a greywacke monolith pyramid replaced. The complex is accessed from the north-east via a long corridor linked off the street which leads into the courtyard. West of the courtyard is the north side of the pyramid. South of the courtyard is the inner temple. Her complex is surrounded by the pyramids of Ankhesenpepi II to the west, Inenek-Inti to the east, and the Western pyramid to the north.

=== Pyramid of Ankhesenpepi II ===
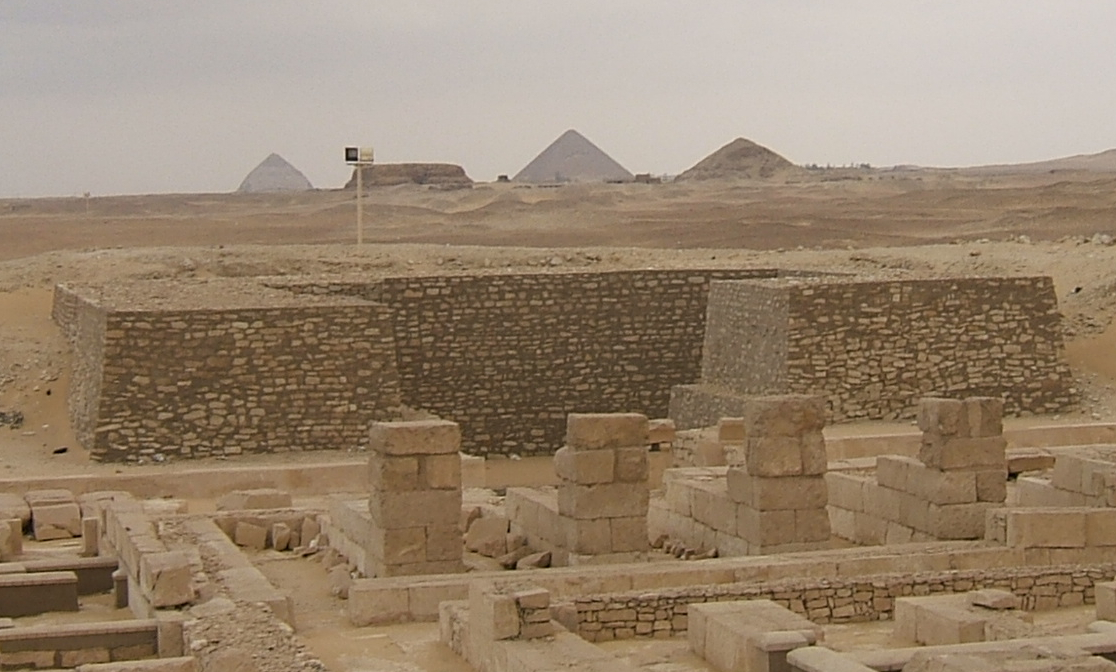
Pyramid of Queen Ankhesenpepi II

Ankhesenpepi II was a wife of Pepi I and mother to Pepi II. Her pyramid lies south-west of Meritites IV's pyramid, at the south-western corner of the complex. With a base length of 31.4 m (103 ft; 59.9 cu), it is the largest pyramid in the complex after the pyramid of Pepi I. The outer, or public, mortuary temple was built on a north–south axis. To the west are a series of twenty-one storerooms arranged in a tooth-comb fashion, and to the south is a large courtyard with two doors. The south-east door leads to the inner, or private, template. The south-west door leads to the north face of the pyramid.

On the north face of the pyramid, remnants of a 4.2 metres (14 ft; 8.0 cu) wide north chapel were found. The substructure to the pyramid was discovered filled with sand and debris, but once cleared revealed a large 7.34 m (24.1 ft; 14.01 cu) (east-west) by 3.15 m (10.3 ft; 6.01 cu) (north-south) burial chamber. To the east was an uninscribed serdab. The burial chamber of Akhesenpepi II's pyramid contains a massive, carefully dressed basalt sarcophagus. The body of the sarcophagus is 2.84 m (9.3 ft) long by 1.27 m (4.2 ft) wide. It had a lid, found fragmented into four pieces, that appears to have been made from a different material to the sarcophagus body. The queen's titulary appear on the sarcophagus and lid identifying her as the mother of the king, and daughter of Geb and Nut. Bone fragments of the arm, leg and foot were recovered during evacuation of the sarcophagus. These were identified as belonging to a mature adult female with osteoarthritis. The walls of the substructure contain Pyramid Texts.

In the mortuary temple of Ankhesenpepi II's funerary monument, a decorative block bearing the cartouches of Pepi I, Pepi II and Merenre I was discovered in 1998. The first two cartouches were easily explained: Pepi I was the husband of Ankhesenpepi II, and Pepi II was her son. The third, that of Mererenre I, remained unexplained until a damaged second decorative block was found in the pillared courtyard a year later. It bore the titles of Queen Ankhesenpepi II and identified her as the wife of Merenre I. According to Labrousse, Ankhesenpepi II remarried to Merenre I, her nephew, after the death of Pepi I.

=== Pyramid of Ankhesenpepi III ===
Ankhesenpepi III was a daughter of Merenre I Nemtyemsaf and a wife of Pepi II. Her pyramid is located north of Ankhesenpepi II's pyramid, and south-west of Mehaa's. Her pyramid complex is the smallest in Pepi I's greater complex. Its size constrained by the boundary of the complex to the west, Ankhesenpepi II's mortuary temple to the south and east, and an esplanade to the north that likely contained worship facilities. The pyramid has a base length of 15.72 m (51.6 ft; 30.00 cu). The complex is entered at the north-east corner of the north wall and is preceded by two obelisks. On the east face of the pyramid is the mortuary temple which has been reduced to an intimate temple consisting of two rooms leading to the offering hall. South-east of the pyramid is a small courtyard which hosts a cult pyramid in its center. Fragments of a decree from Pepi II honouring Ankhesenpepi III were found north of the complex's enclosure wall.

The burial chamber of the pyramid is badly damaged. It contains a sarcophagus made from a single sandstone block buried in the floor, with a lid of roughly cut granite. The walls around the sarcophagus have been painted to represent the royal palace facade. The sarcophagus is inscribed with Ankhesenpepi III's name and titles, and contained bone fragments.

In the western part of the funerary complex, a mudbrick superstructure was uncovered. A shaft by the structure led to a vaulted chamber, through which a decorated limestone burial chamber could be accessed. The burial appears to date to the First Intermediate Period. The owner of the burial is Ankhnes, a priestess of Hathor of Ankhesenpepi III. Alongside the burial, a 38 cm (15 in) decorative wooden statuette of the subject and five decorated wooden mirror handles were recovered.

=== Pyramid of Mehaa and Hornetjerikhet's tomb ===
Mehaa was a wife of Pepi I. She was buried in a pyramid at the end of "Queen's street" (rue de reines). Before the pyramid is a building, which bears the name and image of Prince Hornetjerikhet, a son of Pepi I.

=== Pyramid of Behenu ===
Behenu was a wife of Pepi I or Pepi II. In 2007, the remains of her pyramid were uncovered. The pyramid is located at the western end of the complex, directly north of Mehaa's pyramid. It has a base length of 26.2 m (86 ft; 50.0 cu), making it the second-largest Queens' pyramid in the necropolis after that of Ankhesenpepy II. Fragments found in the mortuary temple identified the owner, Behenu. The name matches fragments of Pyramid Texts previously found around the tomb of Reherishefnakht. These fragments must have originated from the chambers of her pyramid. The walls surrounding the sarcophagus in the burial chamber were adorned with a black and red painted rendition of the royal palace facade and text inscribed above. Fragments of green paint have been retained on some of the inscribed hieroglyphs, with black and red painted lines separating vertical registers.

The enclosure to the complex is entered near the north-east corner off a north–south street. The doorway leads into a vestibule with a door to the courtyard in its north-western corner. The courtyard has two doorways. The first, in the south-east leads to a vestibule with two connecting rooms. To the north is a long windowless vestibule. To the west are a series of ten store-rooms. A second door in the north-west of the courtyard leads into the inner, or private, temple. Here a series of rooms can be accessed from a north–south running passage including: a windowless room, the statue chapel and the offering hall. At the south-east corner of the pyramid is a small courtyard with a cult pyramid at its center. The cult pyramid has a base length of 5.5 m (18 ft; 10.5 cu).

In the debris of the temple, which bore marks of destruction and restoration, a preserved statuette head of Behenu wearing a wig and with in-laid eyes was found. An offering table discovered in the vicinity of Behenu's monument has identified a daughter of Behenu named Hapi.

=== Pyramid of Reherishefnakht ===
In 2004, a pyramid belonging to an individual named Reherishefnakht was discovered in the complex of Pepi I's pyramid. The pyramid likely dates to the end of the Eleventh Dynasty, and is thus the oldest known pyramid not built for a member of the royal family. It has a base length of 13.12 m (43.0 ft; 25.04 cu) made from limestone blocks presumably scavenged from nearby structures. Remnants of stelae, offering tables, door stops and lintel, many of which bear names were found in the core of the pyramid. One significant find is the name of a previously unknown wife of Pepi I, Sebutet. The pyramid substructure contains both Pyramid Texts and Coffin Texts, thus representing a link between the Old Kingdom and Middle Kingdom of Egypt. The substructure has a simple design: from the north, a shaft leads to the burial chamber covered with stone slabs, one of which bears Reherishefnakht's name. The chamber was richly decorated, and contained Pyramid Texts 214–217 and Coffin Text 335. No other buildings associated with pyramid complexes were built, and no burial for a wife of Reherishefnakht was found.

== See also ==
- List of Egyptian pyramids
- List of megalithic sites

== Sources ==
- Allen, James (2001). "Pyramid Texts". In Redford, Donald B. (ed.). The Oxford Encyclopedia of Ancient Egypt, Volume 3. Oxford: Oxford University Press. pp. 95–98. ISBN 978-0-19-510234-5.
- Allen, James (2005). Der Manuelian, Peter (ed.). The Ancient Egyptian Pyramid Texts. Writings from the Ancient World, Number 23. Atlanta: Society of Biblical Literature. ISBN 978-1-58983-182-7.
- Allen, James; Allen, Susan; Anderson, Julie; et al. (1999). Egyptian Art in the Age of the Pyramids. New York: The Metropolitan Museum of Art. ISBN 978-0-8109-6543-0. OCLC 41431623.
- Altenmüller, Hartwig (2001). "Old Kingdom: Sixth Dynasty". In Redford, Donald B. (ed.). The Oxford Encyclopedia of Ancient Egypt, Volume 2. Oxford: Oxford University Press. pp. 601–605. ISBN 978-0-19-510234-5.
- Arnold, Dieter (2005). "Royal cult complexes of the Old and Middle Kingdoms". In Schafer, Byron E. (ed.). Temples of Ancient Egypt. London, New York: I.B. Taurus. pp. 31–86. ISBN 978-1-85043-945-5.
- Bárta, Miroslav (2005). "Location of the Old Kingdom Pyramids in Egypt". Cambridge Archaeological Journal. 15 (2). Cambridge: 177–191. doi:10.1017/s0959774305000090. S2CID 161629772.
- Bárta, Miroslav (2017). "Radjedef to the Eighth Dynasty". UCLA Encyclopedia of Egyptology.
- Billing, Nils (2018). The Performative Structure: Ritualizing the Pyramid of Pepy I. Leiden & Boston: Brill. ISBN 978-90-04-37237-5.
- "Campagne 2007" (in French). Mission archéologique française de Saqqâra. 2009-09-20. Archived from the original on 2009-02-20.
- Chauvet, Violet (2001). "Saqqara". In Redford, Donald B. (ed.). The Oxford Encyclopedia of Ancient Egypt, Volume 3. Oxford: Oxford University Press. pp. 176–179. ISBN 978-0-19-510234-5.
- Clayton, Peter A. (1994). Chronicle of the Pharaohs. London: Thames & Hudson. ISBN 978-0-500-05074-3.
- Collombert, Philippe (2011). "Découvertes récentes de la mission archéologique française à Saqqâra (campagnes 2007-2011)". Comptes rendus des séances de l'Académie des Inscriptions et Belles-Lettres (in French). 155 (2): 921–938. doi:10.3406/crai. ISSN 1969-6663.
- Dobrev, Vassil (1996). "Les marques sur pierres de construction de la nécropole de Pépi Ier. Étude prosoprographique". Bulletin de l'Institut Français d'Archéologie Orientale (in French). 96: 103–142. ISSN 0255-0962.
- Dobrev, Vassil (1998). "Les marques de la pyramide de Pépy Ier. Notes complémentaires". Bulletin de l'Institut Français d'Archéologie Orientale (in French). 98: 151–170. ISSN 0255-0962.
- Dodson, Aidan; Hilton, Dyan (2004). The Complete Royal Families of Ancient Egypt. London: Thames & Hudson. ISBN 978-0-500-05128-3.
- Dodson, Aidan (2016). The Royal Tombs of Ancient Egypt. Barnsley, South Yorkshire: Pen & Sword Archaeology. ISBN 978-1-47382-159-0.
- Edwards, Iorwerth (1993) [1947]. The pyramids of Egypt. London: Penguin Books. ISBN 978-0140136340. OCLC 473229011.
- Eyre, Christopher (2002). The Cannibal Hymn: A Cultural and Literary Study. Liverpool: Liverpool University Press. ISBN 978-0-85323-706-8.
- Grimal, Nicolas (1992). A History of Ancient Egypt. Translated by Ian Shaw. Oxford: Blackwell Publishing. ISBN 978-0-631-19396-8.
- Hays, Harold M. (2009). "Unreading the pyramids". Bulletin de l'Institut Français d'Archéologie Orientale. 109: 195–220. ISSN 0255-0962.
- Hays, Harold M. (2012). The Organization of the Pyramid Texts: Typology and Disposition (Volume 1). Probleme de Ägyptologie. Vol. Band 31. Leiden, Boston: Brill. ISBN 978-90-04-22749-1. ISSN 0169-9601.
- Hellum, Jennifer (2007). The Pyramids. Westport, CT: Greenwood Press. ISBN 9780313325809.
- Janák, Jiří (2013). Wendrick, Willeke; Dieleman, Jacco; Frood, Elizabeth; Baines, John (eds.). "Akh". UCLA Encyclopedia of Egyptology. Los Angeles: University of California. ISBN 978-0-615-21403-0.
- Janot, Francis (2000). "Annexe B Les ossements découverts dans le sarcophage d'Ânkhesenpépy II in La dixième pyramide à textes de Saqqâra : Ânkhesenpépy II. Rapport préliminairede la campagne de fouilles 2000". Bulletin de l'Institut Français d'Archéologie Orientale (in French). 100. Cairo: Institut français d’archéologie orientale: 283. ISSN 0255-0962.
- Kanawati, Naguib (2003). Conspiracies in the Egyptian Palace: Unis to Pepy I. Oxford and New York: Routledge. ISBN 0-415-61937-8.
- Labrousse, Audran (2000a). "Une épouse du roi Mérenrê Ier: la reine Ânkhesenpépy II". In Bárta, Miroslav; Krejčí, Jaromír (eds.). Abusir and Saqqara in the Year 2000 (in French). Prague: Academy of Sciences of the Czech Republic – Oriental Institute. pp. 485–490. ISBN 80-85425-39-4.
- Labrousse, Audran (2000b). "II. De nouveaux ensembles de Textes des Pyramidessur le site de la nécropole de Pépy Ier in La dixième pyramide à textes de Saqqâra : Ânkhesenpépy II. Rapport préliminairede la campagne de fouilles 2000". Bulletin de l'Institut Français d'Archéologie Orientale (in French). 100. Cairo: Institut français d’archéologie orientale: 277–279. ISSN 0255-0962.
- Leclant, Jean (1999). "Saqqara, pyramids of the 5th and 6th Dynasties". In Bard, Kathryn (ed.). Encyclopedia of the Archaeology of Ancient Egypt. London & New York: Routledge. pp. 865–869. ISBN 978-0-203-98283-9.
- Leclant, Jean; Labrousse, Audran (1998). "La nécropole des reines de Pépy Ier à Saqqâra (1988-1998)" (PDF). Comptes rendus des séances de l'Académie des Inscriptions et Belles-Lettres (in French) (2): 481–491. doi:10.3406/crai.1998.15882.
- Leclant, Jean; Labrousse, Audran (2006). "Découvertes récentes de la Mission archéologique française à Saqqâra (campagnes 2001-2005)". Comptes rendus des séances de l'Académie des Inscriptions et Belles-Lettres (in French). 150 (1): 103–120. doi:10.3406/crai. ISSN 1969-6663.
- Legros, Rémi (2017). "Inhumations privées dans la nécropole de Pépy Ier". In Bárta, Miroslav; Coppens, Filip; Krejčí, Jaromír (eds.). Abusir and Saqqara in the year 2015 (in French). Prague: Czech institute of Egyptology. pp. 211–218. ISBN 978-80-7308-758-6.
- Lehner, Mark (2008). The Complete Pyramids. New York: Thames & Hudson. ISBN 978-0-500-28547-3.
- Malek, Jaromir (2003). "The Old Kingdom (c. 2686–2160 BC)". In Shaw, Ian (ed.). The Oxford History of Ancient Egypt. Oxford: Oxford University Press. pp. 83–107. ISBN 978-0-19-815034-3.
- Megahed, Mohamed (2016). "The antichambre carée in the Old Kingdom. Decoration and function". In Landgráfová, Renata; Mynářová, Jana (eds.). Rich and great: studies in honour of Anthony J. Spalinger on the occasion of his 70th Feast of Thoth. Prague: Charles University in Prague, Faculty of Arts. pp. 239–259. ISBN 9788073086688.
- Naggar, Catherine Berger-El; Fraisse, Marie-Noëlle (2008). "Béhénou, "aimée de Pépy ", une nouvelle reine d'Égypte". Bulletin de l'Institut Français d'Archéologie Orientale (in French). 108: 1–27. ISSN 0255-0962.
- "Nécropole de Pépy Ier" (in French). Mission archéologique franco-suisse de Saqqâra. 2016.
- Osing, Jürgen (1994). "Zu Spruch 534 der Pyramidentexte". Hommages à Jean Leclant (in German). Vol. 1. Cairo: Institut français d'archéologie orientale. pp. 279–285. ISBN 2-7247-0134-8.
- Shaw, Ian, ed. (2003). The Oxford History of Ancient Egypt. Oxford: Oxford University Press. ISBN 978-0-19-815034-3.
- Theis, Christoffer (2010). Kahl, Jochem; Kloth, Nicole (eds.). "Die Pyramiden der Ersten Zwischenzeit. Nach philologischen und archäologischen Quellen". Studien zur Altägyptischen Kultur (in German). 39. Hamburg: Helmut Buske Verlag GmBH: 321–339. ISBN 978-3-87548-584-4.
- Verner, Miroslav (1994). Forgotten Pharaohs, Lost Pyramids: Abusir (PDF). Prague: Academia Škodaexport. ISBN 978-80-200-0022-4. Archived from the original (PDF) on 2011-02-01.
- Verner, Miroslav (2001a). "Old Kingdom". In Redford, Donald B. (ed.). The Oxford Encyclopedia of Ancient Egypt, Volume 2. Oxford: Oxford University Press. pp. 585–591. ISBN 978-0-19-510234-5.
- Verner, Miroslav (2001b). "Pyramid". In Redford, Donald B. (ed.). The Oxford Encyclopedia of Ancient Egypt, Volume 3. Oxford: Oxford University Press. pp. 87–95. ISBN 978-0-19-510234-5.
- Verner, Miroslav (2001c). The Pyramids: The Mystery, Culture and Science of Egypt's Great Monuments. New York: Grove Press. ISBN 978-0-8021-1703-8.
- Wilkinson, Richard H. (2000). The Complete Temples of Ancient Egypt. New York: Thames & Hudson. ISBN 978-0-500-05100-9.
