= Pyramid of Reherishefnakht =

Pyramid tomb in Saqqara, Egypt

- Location within Egypt
- 29°51′14″N 31°13′4″E
- Owner: Reherishefnakht
- Constructed: 11th Dynasty
- Type: Pyramid
- Material: limestone
- Base: 13.10 m

The pyramid of Reherishefnakht is the tomb of the ancient Egyptian official Reherishefnakht. It is located in south Saqqara and was built right next to the pyramid of the 6th Dynasty pharaoh Pepi I. Reherishefnakht's pyramid however was probably built at the end of the 11th Dynasty (c. 2150–1991 BC) or the beginning of the 12th Dynasty (1991– 1802 BC). It is the oldest Egyptian pyramid built for a person who was not a member of the royal family. The pyramid was discovered a few years before it was first excavated by Audran Labrousse and the Mission Archéologique Française de Saqqâra in 2005.

== Pyramid ==
The base of the pyramid measures only 13.1 m x 13.1 m and is thus clearly smaller than the surrounding royal pyramids. The building material was mainly limestone rubble, which had originally been used in other nearby buildings and was recycled for this pyramid. Among this material some older offering tables, stele, chapel doorposts and lintels were found.

Several of the blocks are inscribed and contain the names and titles of hitherto unknown individuals from the late Old Kingdom. For example, a broken lintel was found which had belonged to the tomb of a previously unknown wife of Pepi I named Sebutet. Further fragments were discovered which belonged to the burial chamber of a woman named Behenu.

== Substructure ==
From the north, a shaft led down to the burial chamber. This was located underground and was a small room. Its ceiling consisted of plates, located at the same height as the base of the pyramid. The furthest forward of them had the name of the tomb's owner written on them in red paint. The decoration of the burial chamber is a synthesis of motifs from the 6th dynasty and the 11/12th dynasties. For example, a band of hieroglyphs intended for the exterior of a sarcophagus were combined with 6th dynasty motifs used for decorating the interior of sarcophagi. The upper parts of the west and south walls is decorated with a frieze which depicts the burial of Reherishefnakht. The lower parts of the same walls and the whole of the east wall are inscribed with hieroglyphs. The western portion of the inscription consists of spells 214–217 of the Pyramid Texts, while the eastern part contains spell 335 of the Coffin Texts.

== See also ==
- List of Egyptian pyramids
- Egyptian pyramid construction techniques

== Bibliography ==
- Catherine Berger-El Naggar, Audran Labrousse: "La tombe de Rêhérychefnakht à Saqqâra-Sud, un chaînon manquant?" Bulletin de la Société Française d'Égyptologie. Vol. 164, Paris 2005, pp. 14–28.
- Audran Labrousse, Jean Leclant. "Neue Entdeckungen der Mission Archéologique Française de Saqqâra (Kampagnen 2001–2005)." Sokar. No. 13, 2006, pp. 36–37.
- Christoffer Theis. "Die Pyramiden der Ersten Zwischenzeit. Nach philologischen und archäologischen Quellen." Studien zur Altägyptischen Kultur. (SAK) Vol. 39, Hamburg 2010, pp. 321–339.
