= Pyramid of Djedkare Isesi =

Fifth Dynasty Egyptian pyramid complex

Pyramid of Djedkare Sentinel Pyramid Haram el-Shawaf
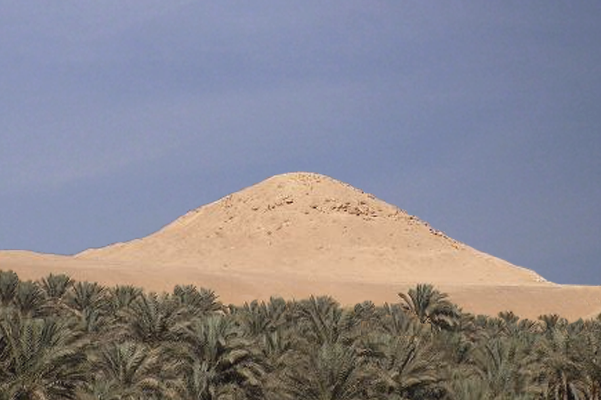

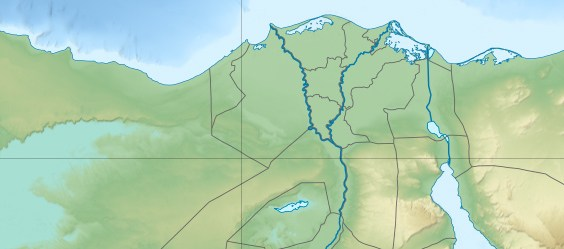
- Location within Lower Egypt
- 29°51′04″N 31°13′15″E
- Owner: Djedkare Isesi
Ancient name
< N5 R11 D28 > F35 O24
Nfr Ḏd-kꜣ-Rꜥ
Nefer Djed-ka-Re
Beautiful is Djedkare
- Constructed: Fifth dynasty of Egypt
- Type: True pyramid (ruined)
- Material: Limestone
- Height: 52.5 m (172 ft; 100 cu) (originally); 24 m (79 ft; 46 cu) (currently)
- Base: 78.75 m (258 ft; 150 cu)
- Volume: 107,835 m^{3} (141,043 cu yd)
- Slope: 52°

The pyramid of Djedkare Isesi (Egyptian: Nfr Ḏd-kꜣ-rꜥ, lit. 'Beautiful is Djedkare') is a late 25th to mid 24th century BC pyramid complex built for the Fifth Dynasty pharaoh Djedkare Isesi. (Note: Proposed dates for Djedkare Isesi's reign: c. 2436–2404 BC, c. 2414–2375 BC, c. 2388–2356 BC, c. 2381–2353 BC, c. 2340–2312 BC, c. 2405/2355–2367/2317 BC. Carbon–14 dating of organic materials from Djedkare's tomb give absolute dates for his reign of 3340–2460 BC, with a common range of 2886–2507 BC.) The pyramid is referred to as Haram el-Shawaf (Arabic: هَرَم ٱلشَّوَّاف, romanized: Haram ash-Shawwāf, lit. 'The Sentinel Pyramid') by locals. It was the first pyramid to be built in South Saqqara.

Djedkare Isesi's monument complex encompasses: a main pyramid; a mortuary temple situated on the east face of the main pyramid; a valley temple buried under modern Saqqara; a causeway that has been only partially dug out; and a cult pyramid. The main pyramid had a six-stepped core built from roughly cut limestone bound together by clay mortar which was then encased in fine white Tura limestone reaching a peak height of 52.5 m (172 ft; 100 cu). The casing has been plundered, and the top three steps of the core have been lost, leaving the pyramid 24 m (79 ft; 46 cu) tall. The basic dimensions of Djedkare's pyramid were adopted by succeeding kings in their own funerary monuments. Inside Djedkare Isesi's pyramid substructure, remains of the burial have been found alongside a mummy presumed to be Djedkare Isesi. The mummy and linen wrapping have undergone radiocarbon dating which have given a common range of 2886–2507 BC. The substructure has otherwise been badly damaged by stone thieves quarrying the Tura limestone casing.

Adjoining the pyramid's east face is the mortuary temple. Flanking the entrance hall to the temple are two large pylon structures. West of the south pylon, a large building with multiple long narrow rooms was discovered. The outline of the building has been preserved by foundational blocks, but its structure is otherwise poorly preserved, and its floor has been lost, possibly to stone thieves. The building has no contemporaries at other Old Kingdom pyramid complexes, and no companion on the north side. Its function is unknown. The mortuary temple was mostly destroyed during the Second Intermediate Period, and used as a burial site in the Eighteenth Dynasty. At the south-east corner of the pyramid, a small cult pyramid is found in an enclosure. It has a T-shaped substructure.

At the north-east corner of the pyramid complex's enclosure wall, a satellite pyramid complex belonging to Queen Setibhor was built. The sub-complex is the largest one built for a queen during the Old Kingdom. It has its own enclosure wall, a mortuary temple and offering hall, storage rooms, antichambre carrée of unparalleled size, a small cult pyramid, and otherwise incorporates features that were previously reserved exclusively for the complexes of the king.

== Location and excavation ==
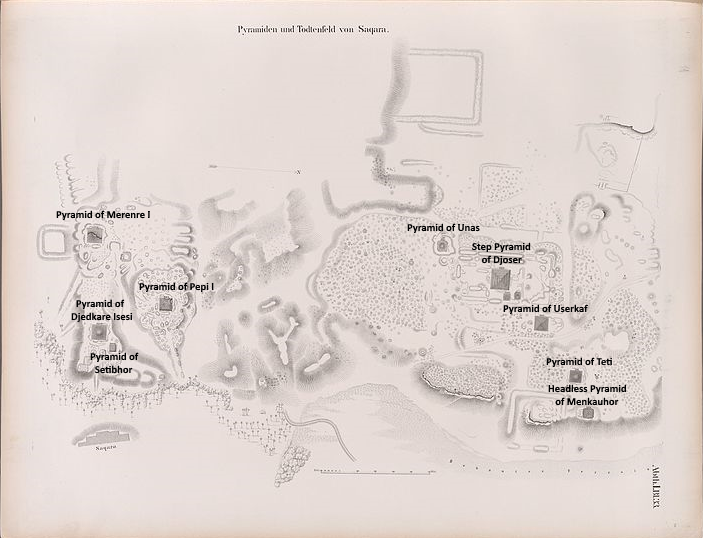
Annotated map of the Saqqara plateau

The last kings of the Fifth Dynasty moved their funerary building activities from Abusir back to Saqqara. Djedkare Isesi built his pyramid 6 km (3.7 mi) from the Abusir necropolis at a site in South Saqqara. It was the first pyramid to be built in that area. He also abandoned the tradition of building sun temples, indicating a shift in the religious significance from the cult of Ra to the cult of Osiris.

The pyramid was briefly visited by John Shae Perring, and soon after that by Karl Richard Lepsius. The substructure of the pyramid was first explored in 1880 by Gaston Maspero. In the mid-1940s, Alexandŕe Varille and Abdel Salam Hussein attempted the first comprehensive examination of the pyramid, but their work was interrupted and their findings lost. They did discover the skeletal remains of Djedkare Isesi in the pyramid. Ahmed Fakhry's attempt at a comprehensive examination in the 1950s was equally unsuccessful. Relief fragments that Fakhry had discovered were later published by Muhammud Mursi. The area around the causeway and mortuary temple was excavated by Mahmud Abdel Razek.

Architectural plans of the pyramid complex were first published by Vito Maragioglio and Celeste Rinaldi between 1962 and 1977. These have been determined by Mohamed Megahed, Peter Jánosi and Hana Vymazalová to be inconsistent and inaccurate. Since 2010, Megahed has been the director in charge of the pyramids of Djedkare Isesi and Setibhor.

== Mortuary complex ==
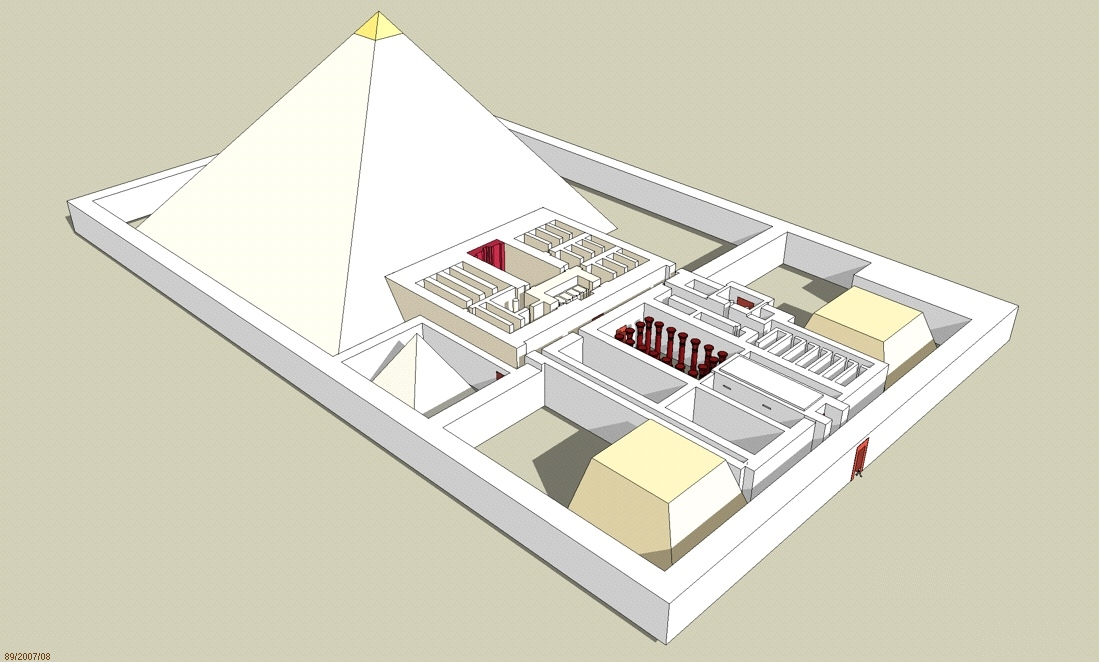
Three dimensional model of Djedkare's pyramid complex

=== Layout ===
Old Kingdom mortuary complexes consisted of five essential components: (1) a valley temple; (2) a causeway; (3) a pyramid, or mortuary, temple; (4) a cult, or satellite, pyramid; and (5) the main pyramid. Djedkare's monument has all of these elements. The main pyramid constructed from six steps of limestone blocks. A valley temple, buried under the modern houses of Saqqara. A causeway, that has not yet been excavated. A mortuary temple on the east side of the pyramid, and a cult pyramid at the south-east corner of the main pyramid, with a standard T-shaped substructure. Additionally, there is an associated pyramid situated on the north-east corner of Djedkare's pyramid complex, belonging to Setibhor, previously known as the "pyramid of the unknown queen".

=== Main pyramid ===
The core of the pyramid was constructed in six steps composed of small irregular pieces of limestone blocks bound together using clay mortar. The length of the base step of the pyramid was 78.75 m (258 ft; 150 cu), with each step built around 7 metres (23 ft; 13 cu) high, converging to the peak at a slope of 52° giving the pyramid an original peak height of 52.5 m (172 ft; 100 cu). These proportions were used by the rulers Teti, Pepi I, Merenre I, (Note: The exact dimensions of Merenre's pyramid are unknown, as the structure has been destroyed and has not been fully excavated yet, though it is assumed that Merenre had planned the pyramid to the same standard dimensions as his predecessor's pyramids.) and Pepi II for their pyramid complexes. The top three steps of the pyramid no longer exist, and what now remains of the pyramid reaches a height of about 24 metres (79 ft; 46 cu). The pyramid was originally encased with fine white Tura limestone. Most of the casing has since been plundered, though some of it has remained intact and has been well preserved.

=== Substructure ===
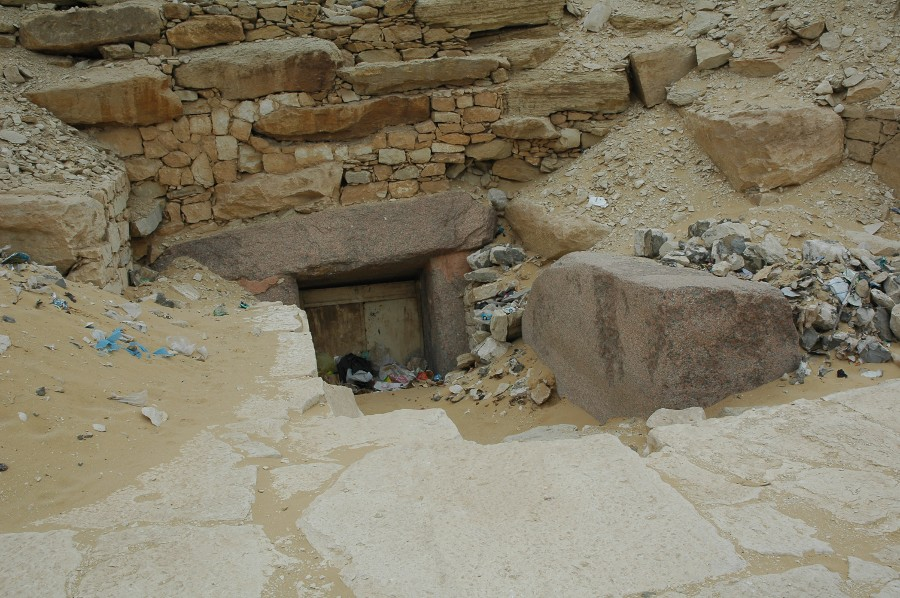
Entrance into the substructure on the north face of the pyramid

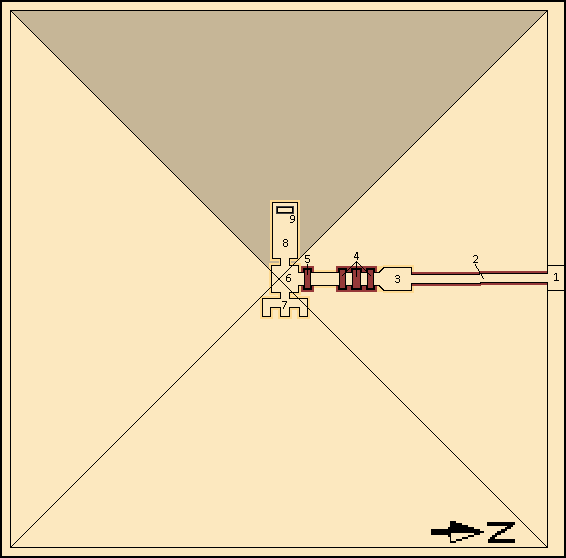
Layout of Djedkare Isesi's substructure. In order: 1) North chapel; 2) Descending corridor; 3) Vestibule; 4 and 5) Granite portculli; 6) Antechamber; 7) Serdab; 8) Burial chamber; 9) Sarcophagus. Granite presented in red, limestone in yellow.

Entry into the substructure was gained from the north side of the pyramid; unusually, however, the entrance is under the pavement of the courtyard, instead of in the north face. There was originally a north chapel here; only traces of it now remain. The entry leads into a granite-lined downward-sloping access corridor. The corridor has a slight angle toward the east, and is the last built to do so. The corridor ends at a vestibule, through which a second corridor lined with limestone, the horizontal passage, is accessed. Remnants of broken vessels were discovered in the vestibule, suggesting that certain burial rituals had been performed there. The horizontal passage was guarded by three granite portcullises near the beginning of the corridor, and a fourth granite portcullis near its end. The exit of the horizontal passage leads into the antechamber, a room measuring 4.02 m (13.2 ft) by 3.1 m (10 ft). To east was a room, the serdab, containing three niches for storage, a developing feature of pyramids of the era. To the west lay the burial chamber, measuring 7.84 m (25.7 ft) by 3.1 m (10 ft), which once contained the basalt sarcophagus of the ruler. Fragments of the sarcophagus were found in a 13 cm (5 in) depression in the floor. The roof of both the antechamber and burial chamber were constructed from two, or perhaps three, layers of gabled limestone blocks, in the same fashion as the pyramids in Abusir. These blocks were 5.25 m (17.2 ft; 10.02 cu) in length.

The rooms of the substructure have been badly damaged by stone thieves, who quarried the Tura limestone walls of the chambers, which has made reconstruction of the planned layout difficult. The serdab was left alone, preserving its structure and flat roof. The masonry core has been exposed in the other chambers, and consists of crudely cut blocks and small limestone chips that were piled up to form the substructure of the pyramid. The wall separating the antechamber and burial chamber has been completely demolished. The substructure has been undergoing significant restoration work over the years, particularly the consolidation of the pyramid's core and the walls of the antechamber and serdab.

Djedkare's sarcophagus originally sat near the west wall of the burial chamber, and at the south-east foot of the sarcophagus, alabaster canopic jars were once buried in a small hole in the ground. Underneath the rubble, only fragments of the sarcophagus and alabaster jars have been found, along with a mummified body of a man in his fifties that is presumed to be pharaoh Djedkare Isesi. The mummy has been dated, as have scraps of linen wrapping, and charcoal taken from the tomb. These samples provided a date range spanning 3340–2460 BC, and a common range of 2886–2507 BC. Miroslav Verner remarks that these results accord better with earlier proposed regnal dates, but contradicts previous astronomically derived dates which favour later proposed regnal dates.

=== Valley temple ===
The valley temple to Djedkare's complex has not been excavated. As it is currently buried under the houses of the modern village of Saqqara.

=== Causeway ===
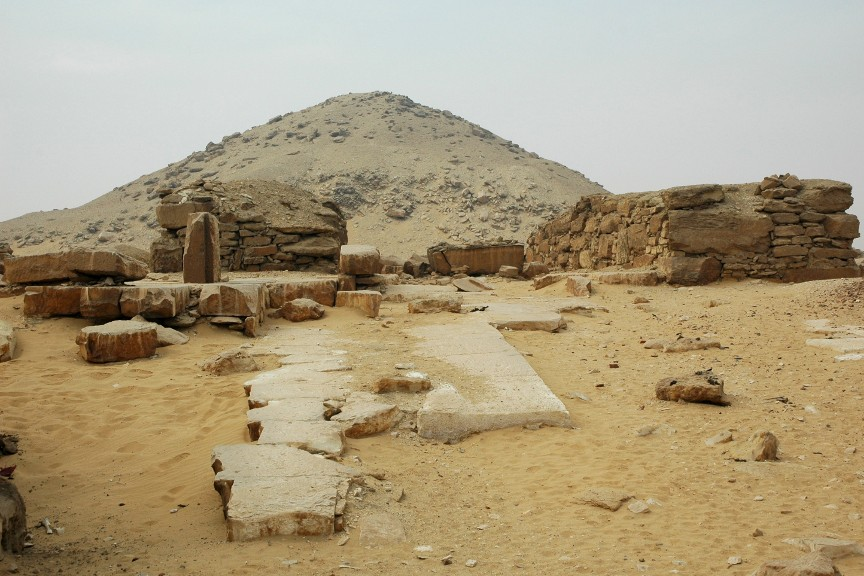
Remnants of the causeway and pylons with Djedkare's pyramid in the background

The causeway that leads up to the mortuary temple has not been excavated. It is known to have a straight sloped path, running slightly southwards for 220 m (722 ft; 420 cu). The ground where the mortuary temple was constructed sloped sharply down towards the desert needing extensive preparation before the laying of the foundation. Dimensions for the causeway are speculative, based only on the trace remains of existing foundations. It had walls approximately 2.4 m (7.9 ft) thick, with a path between them no more than 2.6 m (8.5 ft) wide. Its height remains unknown, though it is clear that it was covered based on blocks found painted with stars, a typical motif for the ceiling. It appears to have been made entirely of white limestone, the same material that makes up the causeway to Sahure's pyramid, with walls decorated with raised relief. The causeway connects to the temple entrance hall between two large pylon structures, an innovation from Nyuserre's pyramid, which were square with slightly inclined walls. The pylons were once 6 m (20 ft; 11 cu) tall, but have reduced to 4.5 m (15 ft). Stairs may have led to the terrace, but likely had no rooms inside. Their function is unclear. A water drain made of crudely cut and carelessly set quartzite blocks was discovered running alongside the causeway.

=== Mortuary temple ===
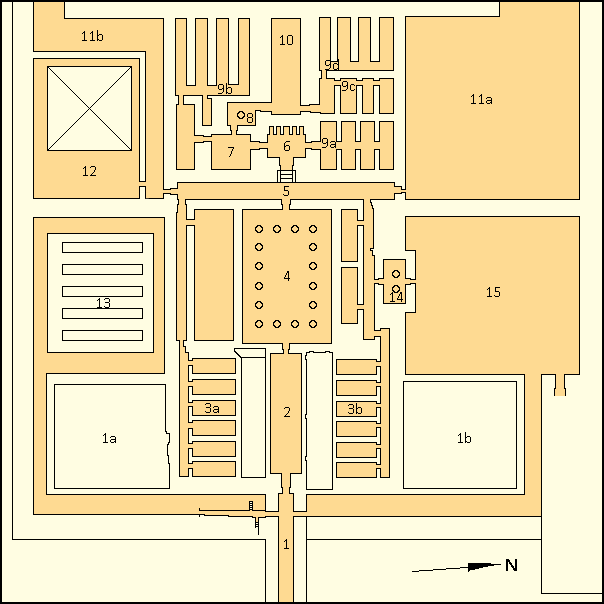
Layout of Djedkare Isesi's mortuary temple. In order: 1) Causeway leading to the temple between (1a-b) two pylons; 2) Entrance hall; (3a-b) Storerooms; 4) Courtyard; 5) Transverse corridor; 6) Five niche chapel; 7) Vestibule; 8) Antichambre carrée; 9a-d) Storerooms surrounding the (10) Offering hall; 11a-b) Pyramid courtyard; 12) Cult pyramid and enclosure; 13) Large structure of unknown purpose; 14) Portico; 15) Cemetery

==== Outer temple ====
The entrance hall of the temple had an alabaster paved floor and likely a vaulted ceiling as indicated by the size of the walls. It terminates into an open courtyard paved with alabaster and adorned with sixteen pink granite palmiform columns. As in Sahure's mortuary temple, the columns bore the names and titles of the complexes' owner, Djedkare Isesi. The courtyard measures 23.45 m (76.9 ft; 44.75 cu) by 15.7 m (52 ft; 30.0 cu). It supported an ambulatory whose ceiling was decorated with stars. Stone thieves have damaged or removed the columns, walls and pavement of the room. The courtyard also once had a water drain built of red quartzite running along its axis and a relief decorated alabaster altar.

Flanking the entrance hall are twelve storage rooms that are accessed from the transverse corridor. A pair of corridors separated by a doorway lead to the southern storage rooms. The western corridor is poorly preserved; the eastern corridor is in better condition. The eastern corridor is 1.6 m (5.2 ft) wide and its preserved sections 14.25 m (46.8 ft) long. The corridor was built of limestone, though only the paved floor has been preserved. A 2 m (6.6 ft) thick wall separated the corridor from the southern pylon. The storage rooms had walls around 1.05 m (3.4 ft; 2.00 cu) thick and measured about 2.6 m (8.5 ft; 5.0 cu) wide by 8.75 m (28.7 ft; 16.70 cu) long. The storage rooms north of the entrance hall are similar in size, but are in far worse condition.

==== Inner temple ====
The courtyard connects to the transverse corridor, which has a low staircase in its west wall leading into the inner temple. The inner temple occupied an area 29.55 m (96.9 ft; 56.39 cu) by 41.56 m (136.4 ft; 79.31 cu) built on a raised platform some 66 cm (26 in; 1.26 cu) high. The chambers of the inner temple were originally paved with alabaster, but only the limestone paved storage rooms have any original floor remaining.

A small passage led inside to the chapel with its five statue niches, followed by a vestibule to a small square room with a single granite column at its centre – the antichambre carée – before terminating at the offering hall. The chapel has disintegrated, its dimensions are indeterminable, as are the dimensions of the red granite lined statue niches. South of the chapel are the remains of a vestibule measuring 6.33 m (20.8 ft; 12.08 cu) by 6.90 m (22.6 ft; 13.17 cu). This room connected to the antichamber carrée, but also to a series of rooms further south.

The antichambre carée measures 4.7 m (15 ft; 9.0 cu) by 4.2 m (14 ft; 8.0 cu). Its north, east, and part of the south walls are lost. Its central column supported the room's ceiling, and bore the names and titles of Djedkare Isesi, as well as an image of Nekhbet, the goddess of Upper Egypt. (Note: The column was south of the main east-west axis of the temple, and hence under Nekhbet's protection.) Shaped like a palm, it was made of red granite with a diameter of 0.65 m (2.1 ft) at the top and 0.73 m (2.4 ft) at its bottom. Some previously discovered relief fragments may have come from this room. They depict scenes of deities possessing Was-sceptres and ankh symbols, shrines of Upper and Lower Egypt, acts of ritualistic slaughter, and bowing officials.

There was once a red granite doorway on the north wall of the antechamber that allowed access into the offering hall. The offering hall of the temple is similar to other contemporary offering halls in other complexes, with the exception that the false door was carved into the masonry of the pyramid. The walls of the hall are the thickest of any room in the inner temple at 2.6 metres (8.5 ft; 5.0 cu) deep, owing to two rows of limestone blocks carved into the form of a vault. The ceiling, of which little remains, was painted dark blue and decorated with yellow stars. The chamber measured between 15.7 metres (52 ft; 30.0 cu) and 18 metres (59 ft; 34 cu) deep by 5.25 m (17.2 ft; 10.02 cu) wide, indicating that it might have been larger than typical for the period. It can be inferred from contemporary sources that the hall contained an alabaster altar and table, a basin and a drainage system. Though nothing, except a few scraps of alabaster that may belong to the altar, of these installations remains.

Surrounding the inner temple were storage rooms on either side. The southern storage rooms were accessed from the vestibule. The four magazines measured 12.2 m (40 ft; 23.3 cu) deep, but narrowed in width from 2.1 m (6.9 ft; 4.0 cu). Most notably, these storage rooms extend into the main pyramid. The northern storage rooms were divided into rows. The eastern row was accessed from the statue chapel, the western rows were accessed from the offering hall. They were not interconnected. The eastern row probably comprises eight chambers, with six storage rooms reconstructed each measuring 3.6 m (12 ft; 6.9 cu) by 2.06 m (6.8 ft; 3.93 cu). The layout of these rooms appears to be particular to this temple. The western rows comprised four rooms each, each room was 6.3 m (21 ft; 12.0 cu) deep and 2.1–2.6 m (6.9–8.5 ft; 4.0–5.0 cu) wide. As in the southern storage rooms, the westernmost row of the northern storage rooms extended into the pyramid. It is unclear whether the storage rooms of the temple were two stories high, as attested in other mortuary temples, as the walls are poorly preserved.

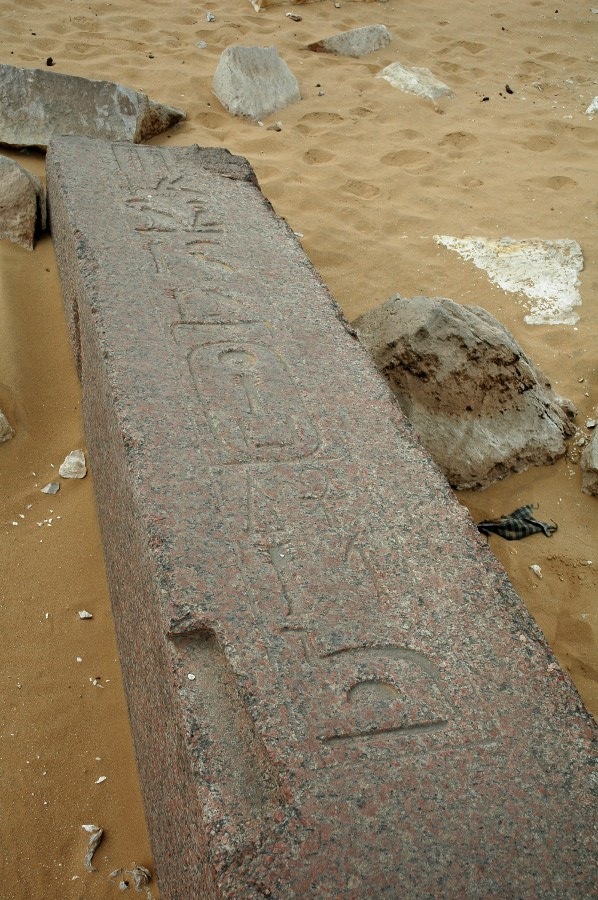
Granite column in Djedkare's mortuary temple, it reads: nsw-bỉt nbty Ḏd-ḫꜣw Bỉk-nbw-ḏd Ḏd-kꜣ-rꜥ di ꜥnḫ ḏd wꜣs ḏt King of Upper and Lower Egypt, Enduring of appearances, (Note: Djed-khau, meaning "Enduring of appearances", is Djedkare's Horus name.) The enduring golden falcon, (Note: Bik-nebu-djed, meaning "the enduring golden falcon", is Djedkare's Golden Horus name.) Djedkare, given life, stability, and serenity forever.

==== Archaeological findings ====
The temple was mostly destroyed during the Second Intermediate Period, and was used as a burial site in the Eighteenth Dynasty. Relief decoration is fragmentary, as extensive damage was done to the walls of the temple by stone thieves. The remnants indicate that the quality of execution both in design and workmanship is comparable to other contemporary works.

Four Djed pillars, three of which were preserved, were recovered from the mortuary temple. These pillars were each 93 cm (3.05 ft) tall, carved on two sides into Djed signs, and appear to have been used as an architectural element in one of the chambers of the temple. Their smooth tops indicate that they may have held some artifact. Two similar, but smaller, pillars were found in Unas' mortuary temple.

Statues of a lion and two sphinxes have been found in the complex. The lion statue, which was carefully sculpted and detailed, is 105 cm (3.44 ft) tall and 107 cm (3.51 ft) long. It is postured into a seated position with paws extended. It is broken, but otherwise very well preserved. By contrast, the two sphinx statues are only partially preserved. They represent recumbent lions, but the faces of both sphinx statues have been damaged. They appear to decorated a wall or formed part of another feature as suggested by the fact that they rest on rectangular pedestals. Sphinx statues in the Old Kingdom are rare. A parallel exists in Unas' complex. A reference to Djedkare's sphinx exists in a biographical inscription of a Kaemtjenenet, who was responsible for organizing the placement of the sphinx and its base in the mortuary temple.

Limestone sculptures of kneeling captives have been found in the temple. These are common, and have been attested to in the temples of Neferefre, Nyuserre, Unas, Teti and Pepi I. The likely providence of these statues is the causeway or entrance hall of the temple, where scenes of enemies being trampled would typically be found. Fragments of an alabaster statue of Djedkare were found in the temple, one of which bears an inscription.

=== Cult pyramid ===
The complex includes a typical cult pyramid at the south-east corner of the pyramid. The pyramid was constructed with a core three steps high. The length of its base was 15.5 m (51 ft; 30 cu) inclined towards the apex at 65° giving it a peak height of 16 m (52 ft; 31 cu). Entry into the substructure was gained through a door on the middle of its north face. The substructure had a standard T-shaped layout, consisting of a downward sloping corridor leading to a single rectangular chamber slightly beneath ground level which was oriented east-west. The cult pyramid was enclosed by a small perimeter wall.

The purpose of the cult pyramid remains unclear. It had a burial chamber but was not used for burials, and instead appears to have been a purely symbolic structure. It may have hosted the pharaoh's ka, or a miniature statue of the king. It may have been used for ritual performances centering around the burial and resurrection of the ka spirit during the Sed festival.

=== Other ===
==== Structure of unknown purpose ====
South of the main mortuary temple was a large 21.8 m (72 ft; 41.6 cu) by 19.85 metres (65.1 ft; 37.88 cu) building of unknown height. Within, there were apparently five, north to south oriented, rectangular rooms 14.3 m (47 ft; 27.3 cu) long by 2.15 metres (7.1 ft; 4.10 cu) wide. Blocks from the foundation of the building have been preserved, but no blocks from a potential floor have been found. It is possible that the floor has been victim to stone quarrying for calcite, as has happened elsewhere in the temple, but physical evidence suggests that a limestone floor is much more likely. In this case, quality limestone must have made up the floor of building. No doors or connecting passages have been found, rendering it difficult to identify the access point into the building. A corridor has been identified stretching from the south-west corner of the pylon, past the south side of the building, and to the enclosure wall of the cult pyramid, where it may have turned north to connect to the transverse corridor. A second potential corridor has been identified running along the east side of the building. It appears that this building was separate from its neighbouring counterparts. The structure is otherwise poorly preserved, and its purpose unknown. No similar structure has been located at other contemporary pyramid complexes of the Old Kingdom, and no companion building on the north side of the mortuary temple either.

==== Cemetery ====
During 2018, a large area constrained between the northern pylon, the mortuary temple and enclosure wall, and Setibhor's pyramid complex was excavated. Clearing of the site revealed three layers of debris. The top layer consisted of windswept sand and limestone chips. The middle layer contained burials of limestone and ceramic coffins, and pottery. The bottom layer had two distinct sectors: west and east. The west sector most contained accumulated trash from the Old Kingdom and First Intermediate Period, including pottery, clay seals, and other small finds. There were few burials in this layer. The east sector contained burials and pottery from the Second Intermediate Period and New Kingdom. Beneath these layers of debris was the ground level. Here, multiple burial pits between 0.2 m (0.66 ft; 0.38 cu) and 0.4 m (1.3 ft; 0.76 cu) were discovered. These contained the oldest burials in the area, estimated to date to the period of the funerary cult of Djedkare Isesi in the late Fifth Dynasty to the First Intermediate Period.

== Pyramid of Setibhor ==
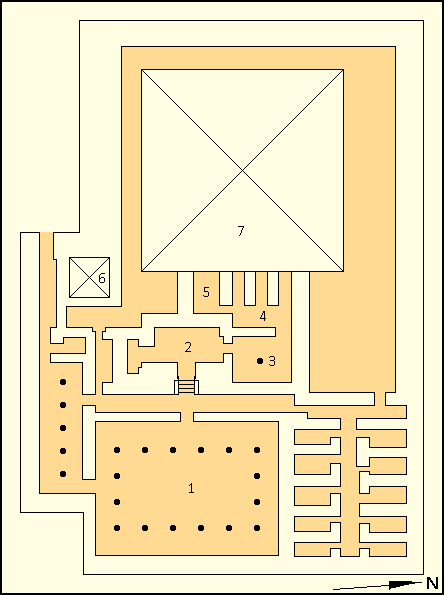
Layout of Setibhor's complex. In order: 1) Colonnaded courtyard; 2) Statue chapel; 3) Antichambre carrée; 4) Storerooms; 5) Offering hall; 6) Cult pyramid; 7) Main pyramid

A satellite pyramid complex is located at the north-east corner of the wall of the complex of Djedkare's pyramid. With the exception of a valley temple and causeway, the satellite pyramid has the standard elements that are typically found only in the king's pyramid. The complex is enclosed within its own perimeter wall and consists of: a pyramid; colonnaded court; statue chapel; a mortuary temple with its own offering hall, storage rooms, and antichambre carrée with single column; and a small cult pyramid. The antichambre carrée of this complex is notable due to its unparalleled size of 7 m (23 ft; 13 cu) by 6 m (20 ft; 11 cu). Its column and base appear to be both be made of limestone, instead of the typical granite. Relief fragments found on limestone blocks may also originate in the chamber. Due to its being intentionally incorporated into the pyramid complex of Djedkare Isesi, the pyramid is believed to have belonged to a consort of Djedkare Isesi. The identity of the owner remained a mystery until 2019, when Setibhor's name and titles were found inscribed on a column in the complex. Setibhor's pyramid complex is thus the largest one built for a queen in the Old Kingdom, and incorporates elements that were previously only used in the complexes of the king.

== Later history ==
=== Burials ===
In 1952, Fahkry explored a necropolis containing seventeen mudbrick tombs located south of the causeway and adjoining the east side of the mortuary temple. He provided a brief account summarizing that the tombs had been robbed of their contents. In 2016, one of those tombs, mastaba MS1, was partially excavated and explored. The structure is dated to the Sixth Dynasty. The tomb measures approximately 5.5 m (18 ft) by 4 m (13 ft) and has six compartments arranged in two rows. The tomb is also connected to another tomb further east.

The first compartment at the north-west corner is accessed through a 4.73 m (15.5 ft) deep shaft leading into a vaulted burial chamber of dimensions 2.64 m (8.7 ft) by 0.85 m (2.8 ft). The chamber and shaft are made of mudbrick. The tomb has been emptied, except for some human remains. Two 2.8 m (9.2 ft) deep shafts, one directly south of the first and the other to its south-east, appear to have been built at the same time. They each lead into burial chambers of very similar proportions, both 3.5 m (11 ft) long by 0.95 m (3.1 ft) wide. The south burial chamber contained fragments of human remains. These too were constructed entirely from mudbrick. They are connected by a 1 m (3.3 ft) vaulted passage. The middle compartment of the north row is arrived to by a 4.96 m (16.3 ft) deep. It contains a vaulted mudbrick burial chamber with dimensions of 2.62 m (8.6 ft) by 1.05 m (3.4 ft). This chamber has been blocked with a wall. The south-east compartment contains a vaulted mudbrick burial chamber 1.2 m (3.9 ft) by 1.3 m (4.3 ft) large. It was included as an apparent afterthought. Remains of multiple individuals were found in the chamber, but their origin is unclear. Other items recovered included faience beads and a seal stamp with a seated lion facing a crouching enemy. This type of seal can be dated to the Sixth Dynasty or the First Intermediate Period.

The north-east compartment is the largest and most significant of the tomb. It is accessed by a 4.75 m (15.6 ft) shaft. The vaulted mudbrick burial chamber here is 3 m (9.8 ft) long, 1.3 m (4.3 ft) wide, and 1.8 m (5.9 ft) tall. It contained a decorated limestone burial chamber 2.9 m (9.5 ft) long, 1.02 m (3.3 ft) wide, and 1.07 m (3.5 ft) tall which was originally closed with limestone slabs. The ceiling of the limestone burial chamber was painted black and red to imitate red granite. Its side walls were decoratively painted with scenes of offerings and a palace façade motif, and have been well preserved, except for at its southern section. Lines of inscription above the decorations identify the owner of the burial: Pepyankh Setju. Above the burial chamber, in the space with the vaulted mudbrick ceiling, an offering table bearing the name Isesi was found.

== See also ==
- Egyptian pyramid construction techniques
- List of Egyptian pyramids
- List of megalithic sites

== Sources ==
- Allen, James; Allen, Susan; Anderson, Julie; et al. (1999). Egyptian Art in the Age of the Pyramids. New York: The Metropolitan Museum of Art. ISBN 978-0-8109-6543-0. OCLC 41431623.
- Altenmüller, Hartwig (2001). "Old Kingdom: Fifth Dynasty". In Redford, Donald B. (ed.). The Oxford Encyclopedia of Ancient Egypt, Volume 2. Oxford: Oxford University Press. pp. 597–601. ISBN 978-0-19-510234-5.
- Arnold, Dieter (2005). "Royal cult complexes of the Old and Middle Kingdoms". In Schafer, Byron E. (ed.). Temples of Ancient Egypt. London, New York: I.B. Taurus. pp. 31–86. ISBN 978-1-85043-945-5.
- Bárta, Miroslav (2005). "Location of the Old Kingdom Pyramids in Egypt". Cambridge Archaeological Journal. 15 (2). Cambridge: 177–191. doi:10.1017/s0959774305000090. S2CID 161629772.
- Clayton, Peter A. (1994). Chronicle of the Pharaohs. London: Thames & Hudson. ISBN 0-500-05074-0.
- "Discovery of a unique tomb and the name of an ancient Egyptian queen in south Saqqara". Czech Institute of Egyptology. 2019-04-02.
- Dodson, Aidan; Hilton, Dyan (2004). The Complete Royal Families of Ancient Egypt. London: Thames & Hudson. ISBN 0-500-05128-3.
- Edwards, Iorwerth (1993) [1947]. The pyramids of Egypt. London: Penguin Books. ISBN 978-0140136340. OCLC 473229011.
- Grimal, Nicolas (1992). A History of Ancient Egypt. Translated by Ian Shaw. Oxford: Blackwell Publishing. ISBN 978-0-631-19396-8.
- Lehner, Mark (2008). The Complete Pyramids. New York: Thames & Hudson. ISBN 978-0-500-28547-3.
- Leprohon, Ronald J. (2013). The Great Name: Ancient Egyptian Royal Titulary. Vol. 33 of Writings from the ancient world. Atlanta: Society of Biblical Literature. ISBN 978-1-589-83736-2.
- Málek, Jaromír (2003). "The Old Kingdom (c.2160-2055 BC)". In Shaw, Ian (ed.). The Oxford History of Ancient Egypt. Oxford: Oxford University Press. pp. 83–107. ISBN 978-0-19-815034-3.
- Megahed, Mohamed (2016a). "The antichambre carée in the Old Kingdom. Decoration and function". In Landgráfová, Renata; Mynářová, Jana (eds.). Rich and great: studies in honour of Anthony J. Spalinger on the occasion of his 70th Feast of Thoth. Prague: Charles University in Prague, Faculty of Arts. pp. 239–259. ISBN 9788073086688.
- Megahed, Mohamed (2016b). "Sculptures from the pyramid complex of Djedkare Isesi at South Saqqara. A preliminary report". Pražské egyptologické studie (17). Prague: Charles University in Prague: 24–33. ISSN 1801-3899.
- Megahed, Mohamed; Jánosi, Peter; Vymazalová, Hana (2017). "Djedkare's pyramid complex: Preliminary report of the 2016 season". Pražské egyptologické studie (19). Prague: Charles University in Prague: 37–52. ISSN 1214-3189.
- Megahed, Mohamed; Jánosi, Peter; Vymazalová, Hana (2018). "Djedkare's pyramid complex: Preliminary report of the 2017 season". Pražské egyptologické studie (21). Prague: Charles University in Prague: 34–44. ISSN 1214-3189.
- Megahed, Mohamed; Jánosi, Peter; Vymazalová, Hana (2019). "Exploration of the pyramid complex of King Djedkare: season 2018". Pražské egyptologické studie (23). Prague: Charles University in Prague: 12–36. ISSN 1214-3189.
- Megahed, Mohamed; Jánosi, Peter (2020). "Exploration of the pyramid complex of King Djedkare: 2019 fall season". Pražské egyptologické studie (25). Prague: Charles University in Prague: 90–102. ISSN 1214-3189.
- "Mgr. Mohamed Abdel Moneim Megahed, Ph.D." Czech Institute of Egyptology. 2017-06-05.
- Porter, Bertha; Moss, Rosalind L. B.; Burney, Ethel W.; Málek, Jaromír (1981). Topographical bibliography of ancient Egyptian hieroglyphic texts, reliefs, and paintings. III Memphis; Pt. 2. Ṣaqqâra to Dahshûr (PDF). Oxford: Griffith Institute. ISBN 978-0-900416-24-8.
- Shaw, Ian, ed. (2003). The Oxford History of Ancient Egypt. Oxford: Oxford University Press. ISBN 978-0-19-815034-3.
- Verner, Miroslav (2001a). "Archaeological Remarks on the 4th and 5th Dynasty Chronology" (PDF). Archiv Orientální. 69 (3). Prague: 363–418. ISSN 0044-8699.
- Verner, Miroslav (2001c). "Old Kingdom". In Redford, Donald B. (ed.). The Oxford Encyclopedia of Ancient Egypt, Volume 2. Oxford: Oxford University Press. pp. 585–591. ISBN 978-0-19-510234-5.
- Verner, Miroslav (2001d). The Pyramids: The Mystery, Culture and Science of Egypt's Great Monuments. New York: Grove Press. ISBN 978-0-8021-1703-8.
- Wilkinson, Richard H. (2000). The Complete Temples of Ancient Egypt. New York: Thames & Hudson. ISBN 978-0-500-05100-9.
