= Behenu =

Egyptian queen consort

Queen consort of Egypt
- Tenure: c. 2280 BC
Egyptian name
D58 O4 F34 G43

Behenu (fl. c. 2280 BC) was an ancient Egyptian queen of the Sixth Dynasty. She is thought to have been the wife of either Pepi I or of Pepi II.

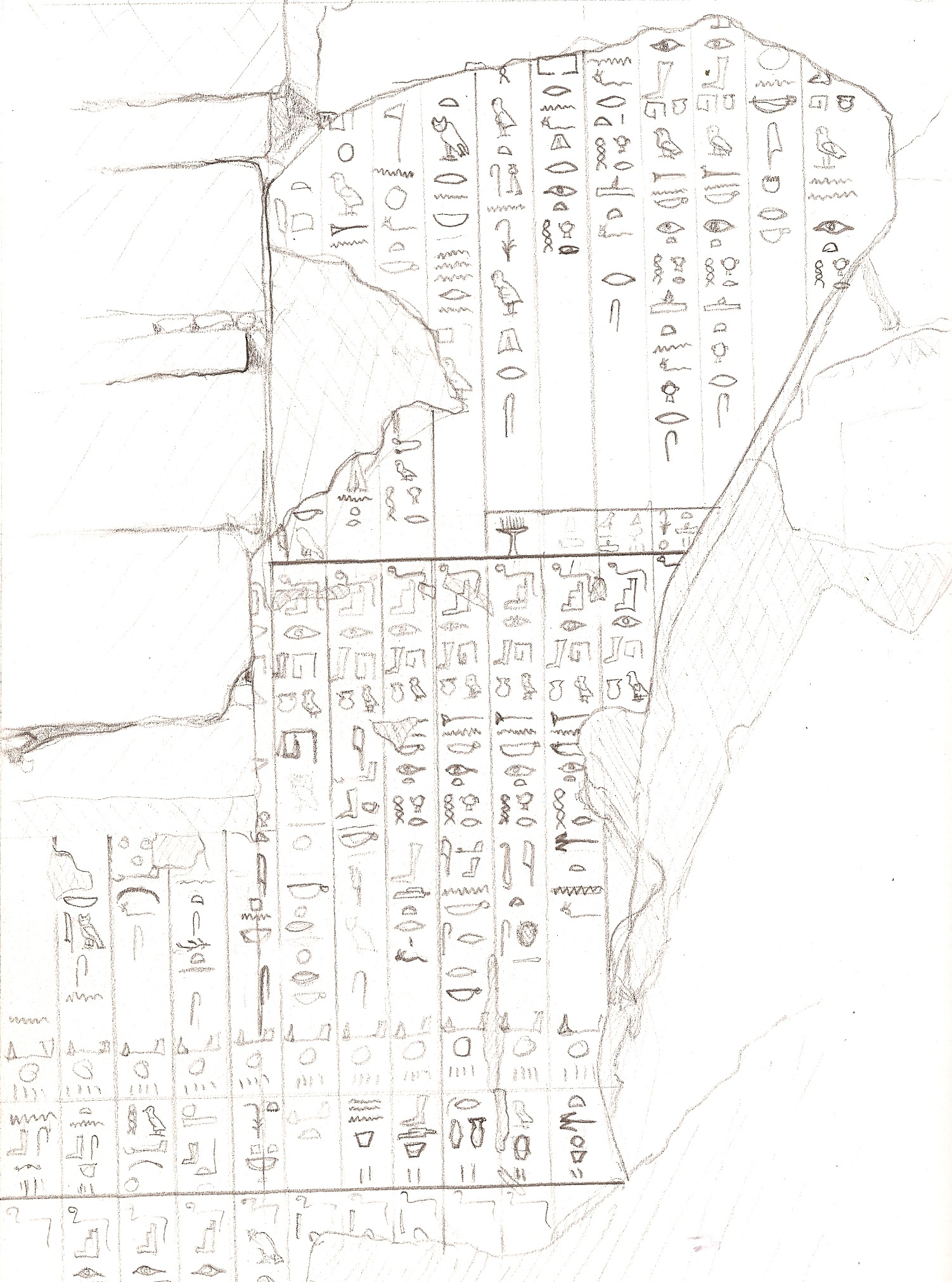
Sketch of Pyramid Texts from the tomb of Behenu

The remnants of her pyramid were first discovered in 2007, and news of the discovery of her burial chamber was made public in March 2010. The complex was discovered in the vicinity of the pyramid of Pepi II, and it is thought that she was most likely the wife of this king, but no inscription has been uncovered that would positively link her to him.

A set of Pyramid Texts was uncovered along with the burial chamber. This is only the second known instance of these ancient religious texts being used in association with a queen instead of the king.
