= John Shae Perring =

British engineer, anthropologist and Egyptologist

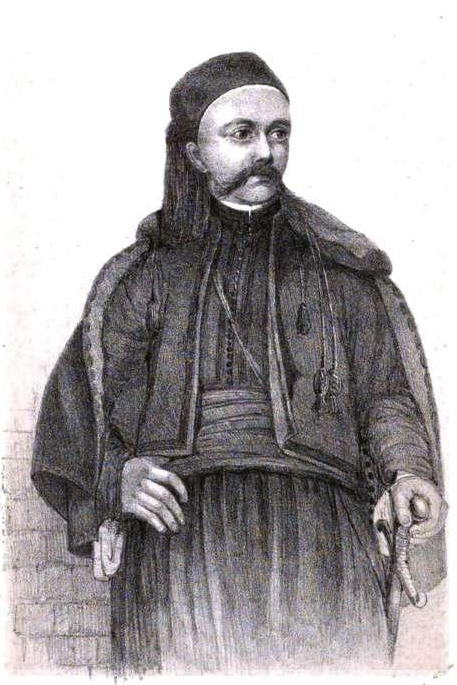
John Shae Perring

John Shae Perring (24 January 1813, Boston, Lincolnshire – 16 January 1869, Manchester) was a British engineer, anthropologist and Egyptologist, most notable for his work excavating and documenting Egyptian pyramids.

== Career ==
In 1837 Perring and British archaeologist Richard William Howard Vyse began excavating at Giza; they were later joined by Giovanni Battista Caviglia. They used gunpowder to force their way into several monuments and then to reach hidden chambers within them, such as the burial chamber of the pyramid of Menkaure, documenting them as they went. When Caviglia left the team to work independently, Perring became Vyse's assistant and when Vyse himself left for England in 1837 Perring continued the excavation with Vyse's financial support.

As part of his work, Perring created several maps, plans and cross-sections of the pyramids at Abu Roasch, Gizeh, Abusir, Saqqara and Dahshur. He was the first to explore the interior of the Pyramid of Userkaf at Saqqara in 1839, through a robber's tunnel first discovered in 1831. Perring thought the pyramid belonged to Djedkare. The pyramid was first correctly identified by Egyptologist Cecil Firth in 1928 (though Firth died in 1931 and excavations there only recommenced in 1948, under Jean-Philippe Lauer). Perring opened the northern entrance into the Bent Pyramid and added some graffiti inside the nearby Red Pyramid at Dahshur, which can still be viewed today.

Perring's work resulted in his three-volume The Pyramids of Gizeh, published from 1839 to 1842. Vyse also published Perring's sketches in the third volume of his own three-part work Operations Carried on at the Pyramids of Gizeh in 1837 with an Account of a Voyage Into Upper Egypt and an Appendix.
