= Red Pyramid =

c. 2600 BC pyramid near Cairo, Egypt, built by pharaoh Sneferu

The Red Pyramid of Dahshur
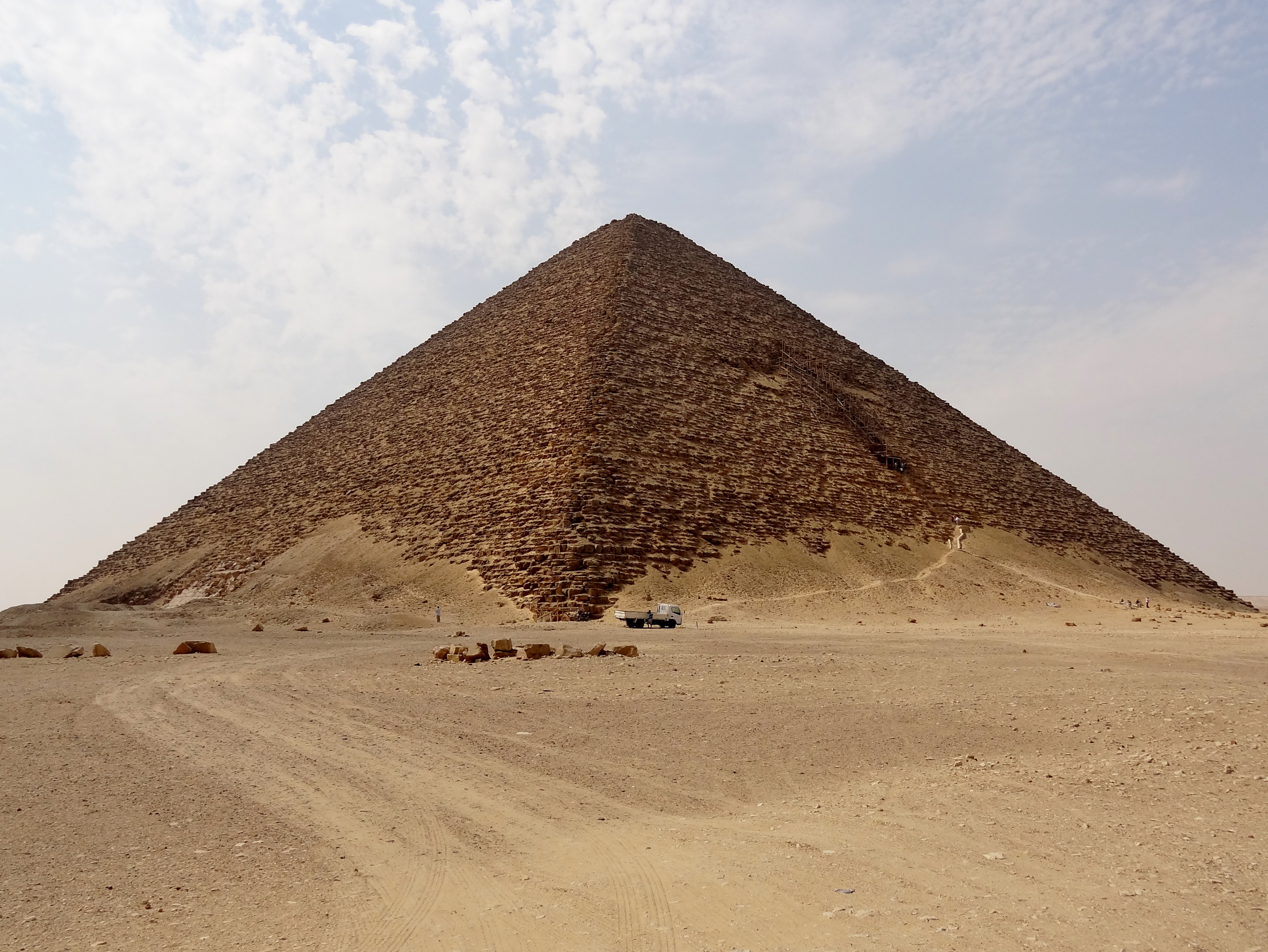

- Location within Egypt
- 29°48′30″N 31°12′21″E
- Owner: Sneferu
Ancient name
< S29 F35 D21 G43 > N28 O24 L2or< S29 F35 D21 G43 > N28 D36 O24 L2
Bitj Ḫˁ Snfrw
Biti Kha Sneferu
"Sneferu Shines in the North"
"The Northern Shining Pyramid"
- Constructed: Fourth Dynasty
- Type: True pyramid
- Material: Limestone
- Height: 105 m (344 ft; 200 cu)
- Base: 220 m (722 ft; 420 cu)
- Volume: 1,694,000 m^{3} (2,216,000 cu yd)
- Slope: 43°22'

The Red Pyramid, or North Pyramid, is a pyramid from the Dahsur necropolis in Cairo, Egypt. Local residents refer to the Red Pyramid as el-heram el-watwaat, meaning the Bat Pyramid. It is the largest pyramid in the necropolis as well as the first successful attempt by Ancient Egyptians at a smooth-sided pyramid. It is the third largest pyramid to exist outside those found at Giza such as the Great Pyramid of Khufu. The pyramid was built during the Old Kingdom, under the Fourth Dynasty ruler Sneferu. It would be one of several pyramids built during this time, and was not Sneferu's first attempt. However, the success would go on to be part of a successful legacy of Egyptian pyramids.

== History ==
Comparison of approximate profiles of the Red Pyramid with some notable pyramidal or near-pyramidal buildings. Dotted lines indicate original heights, where data is available. In its SVG file, hover over a pyramid to highlight and click for its article.

The Red Pyramid was the third pyramid built by Old Kingdom Pharaoh Sneferu, and was built 2575–2563 BCE. The Red Pyramid is located approximately one kilometre (0.62 mi) to the north of the Bent Pyramid. It is built at the same shallow 43-degree angle as the upper section of the Bent Pyramid, which gives it a noticeably squat appearance compared to other Egyptian pyramids of comparable scale. Construction is believed to have begun during the thirtieth year of Sneferu's reign (c. 2590 BCE). Egyptologists disagree on the length of time it took to construct. Based on quarry marks found at various phases of construction, Rainer Stadelmann estimates the time of completion to be approximately 17 years while Rolf Krauss, based on this same graffiti, suggests a period of construction of 10–11 years, an estimate later supported by John Romer.

Archaeologists speculate its design may be an outcome of engineering crises experienced during the construction of Sneferu's two earlier pyramids. The first of these, the Pyramid at Meidum, collapsed in antiquity, while the second, the Bent Pyramid, had the angle of its inclination dramatically altered from 54 to 43 degrees part-way through the construction due to complications that accrued during the three construction phases.

Some archaeologists now believe that the Medium pyramid was the first attempt at building a smooth-sided pyramid, and that it may have collapsed when construction of the Bent Pyramid was already well under way – and that the pyramid may by then have already begun to show alarming signs of instability itself, as evident by the presence of large timber beams supporting its inner chambers. The outcome of this was the change in inclination of the Bent Pyramid, and the commencement of the later Red Pyramid at an inclination known to be less susceptible to instability and therefore less susceptible to catastrophic collapse.

The Red Pyramid, picture taken around February 2007.

== Construction ==
Construction of the pyramid would see usage of nearby limestone deposits that were mined for their ores. The builders, living in small communities constructed nearby the pyramid construction, were drawn from local communities and included many populations from across Egypt in its workforce. Several minerals and materials were found in the nearby pyramid town that played a part in aiding pyramid decoration such as gypsum being found on the site. Furthermore, evidence of a cemetery shows clear signs that this pyramid was a long-term project for this community that saw lives lost in the process of construction. The construction of the Red Pyramid also saw the loss of life from natural causes due to taking a generation of Egyptian workers to complete it: archaeological evidence and Ancient Egyptian historical records date the length of construction to between 20 to 30 years.

The success from this construction would go on to be used in future for later pyramid sites, the prime example being the Great Pyramid of Giza. Construction methods, management of resources, resource allocation was inspired greatly by the Red Pyramid's success: from having nearby settled areas to draw a workforce from, the use of construction techniques from ramps and pulleys, and drawing from nearby mineral deposits and mines for material (at the convenience of both transporting the material as well as constructing use said material).

== Pyramid Town ==
The sites around the Red Pyramid were host to communities of builders, their families, and other workers that would supply the site with foodstuffs, goods, and labor. There were cult sites with temples and offering places that depicted several reliefs that showed familial and marital life, games being played in the desert, and merchants transporting grain. Furthermore, recent excavations from the 2022 onward have uncovered several homes, pieces of pottery, and even inscriptions depicting the names and images of people from that time. Not only local male laborers were included, but the names of women and Nubians included, showing the extent of reach during Sneferu's reign as well as how demanding life may have been during the construction of the Red Pyramid.

== Modern day ==
The Red Pyramid is 105 metres (344 ft) high, and 220 metres (720 ft) wide. Fragments of a rare pyramidion, or capstone, for the Red Pyramid were uncovered and reconstructed, and are now on display at the Red Pyramid's site at Dahshur. However, whether the fragments were actually ever part of a pyramidion is unclear, as the reconstruction's angle of inclination differs from that of the pyramid for which it was apparently intended.

The Red Pyramid, along with the Bent Pyramid, was closed to tourists for many years because of a nearby army camp. It is now usually open for tourists and a somewhat intrusive ventilation system has been installed which pipes air down the entrance shaft to the interior chambers. Visitors climb steps cut in or built over the stones of the pyramid to an entrance high on the north side. A passage, 3 feet (0.91 m) in height and 4 feet (1.2 m) wide, slopes down at 27° for 200 feet (61 m) to the start of a short horizontal passage, and a large hole in the floor about 1.3m deep. The hole is believed to been caused by tomb robbers trying to remove treasure from the pyramid. The short horizontal passage continues after this, leading into a chamber whose corbelled roof is 40 feet (12 m) high and rises in eleven steps. At the southern end of the chamber, but offset to the west, another short horizontal passage leads into the second chamber. This passage was probably closed at one time and the offset was a measure intended to confuse potential tomb robbers. The second chamber is similar to the first and lies directly beneath the apex of the pyramid.

High in the southern wall of the second chamber is an entrance, now reached by a large wooden staircase built for the convenience of tourists. This gives onto a short horizontal passage that leads to the third and final chamber with a corbelled roof 50 feet (15 m) high. The first two chambers have their long axis aligned north-south, but this chamber's long axis is aligned east-west. Unlike the first two chambers, which have fine smooth floors on the same level as the passages, the floor of the third chamber is very rough and sunk below the level of the access passage. It is believed that this is the work of tomb robbers searching for treasure in what is thought to have been the burial chamber of the pyramid. The ceiling and walls are also blackened with soot which may have been caused by torches and possibly by the heating and smashing of the sarcophagus and limestone floor by the tomb robbers.

== Gallery ==
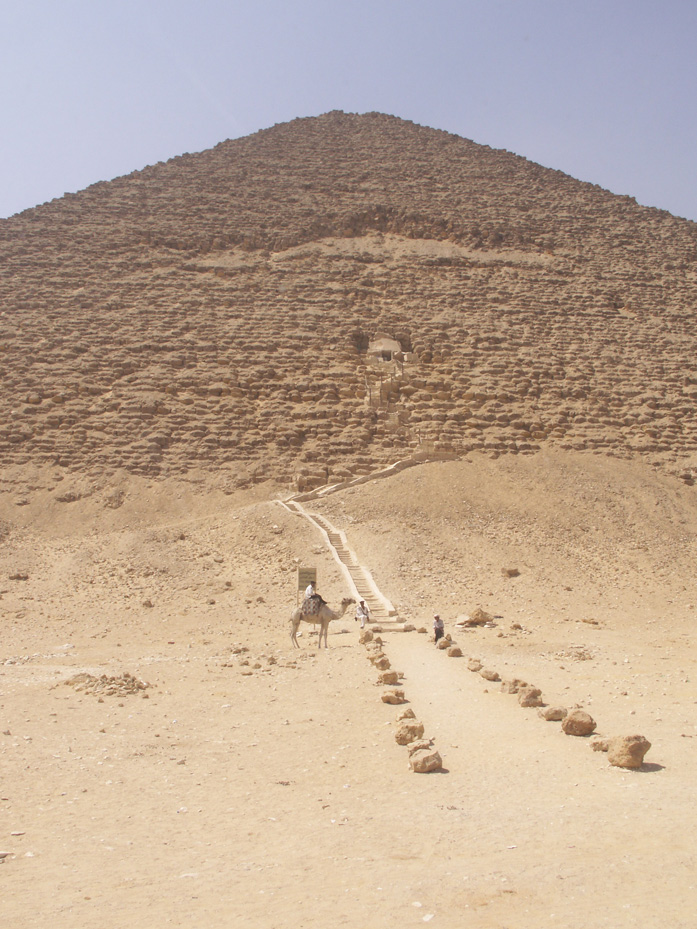
Entry to the pyramid

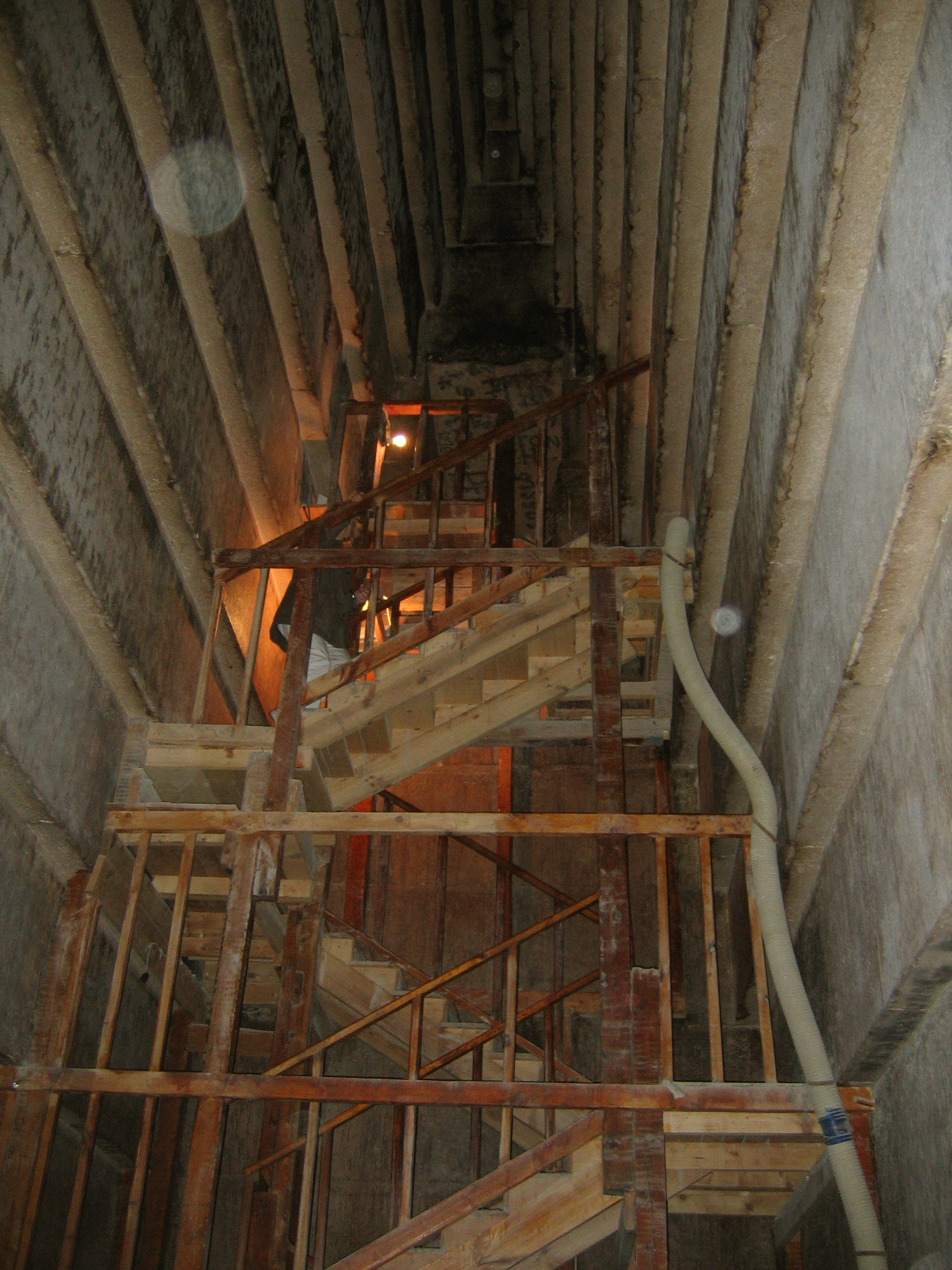
Second chamber with the wooden staircase leading to the burial chamber

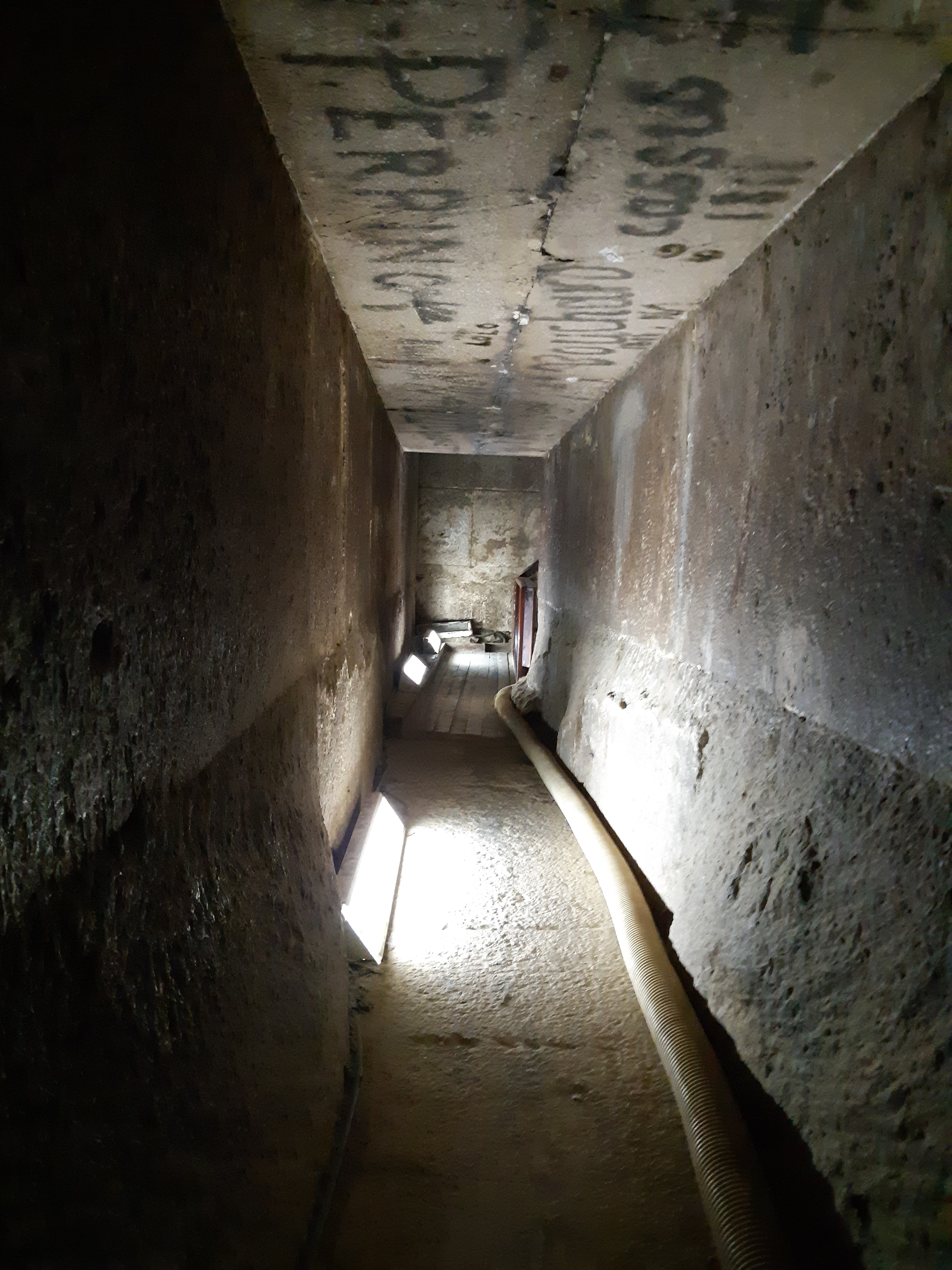
Passage connecting the second and burial chamber, with the lower walls and floor showing damage thought to be caused by tomb robbers

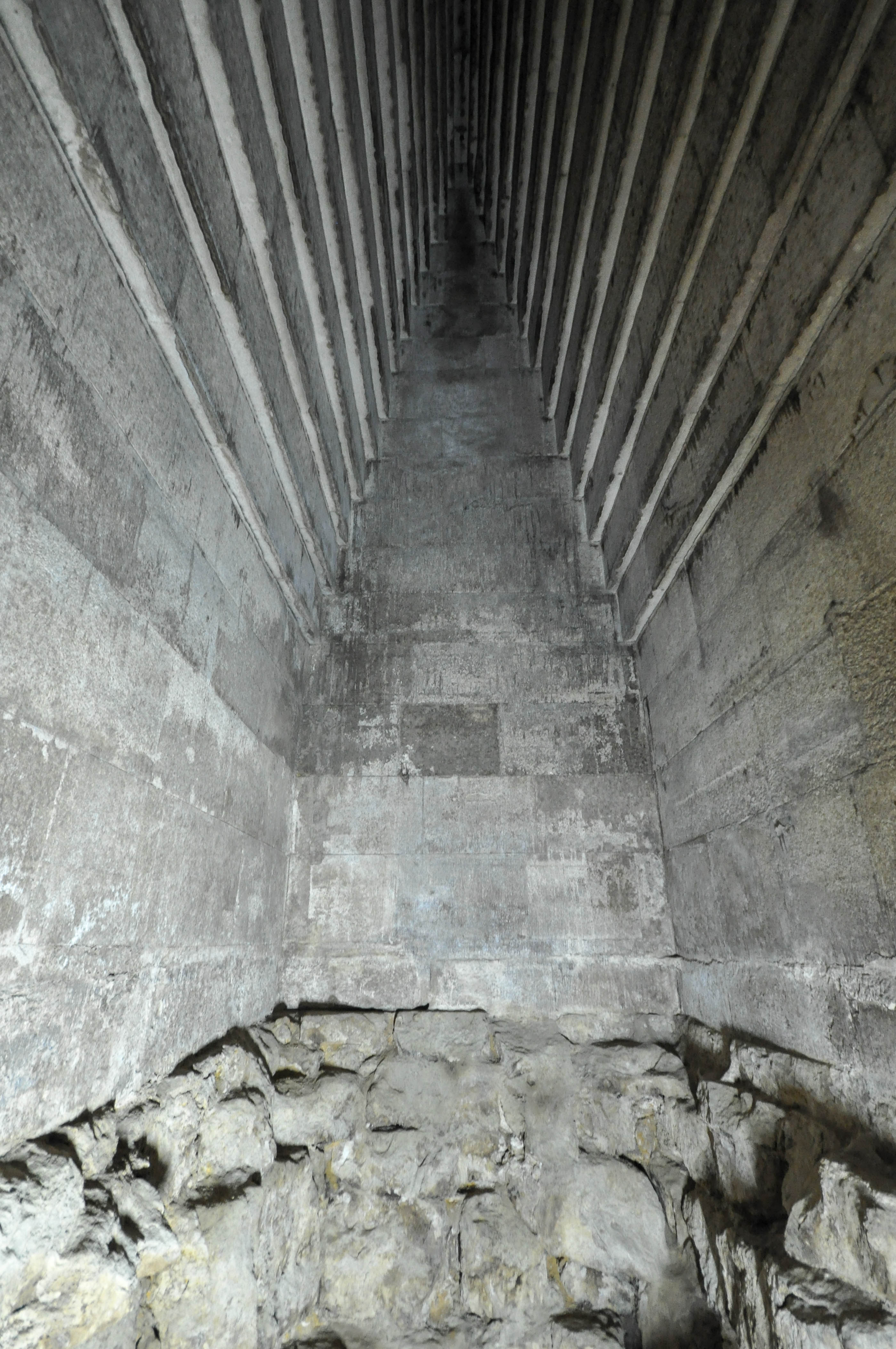
Detail of the massive corbel-vaulted ceiling of the main burial chamber

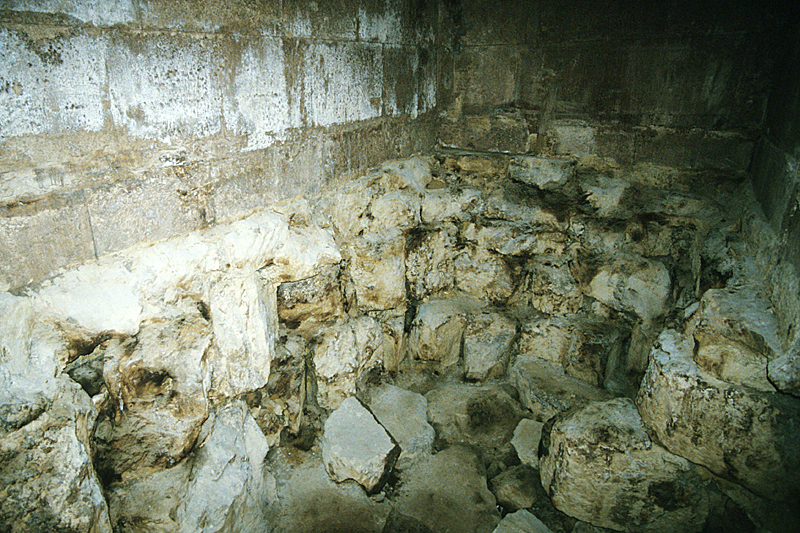
Floor of the burial chamber, showing damage thought to be caused by tomb robbers

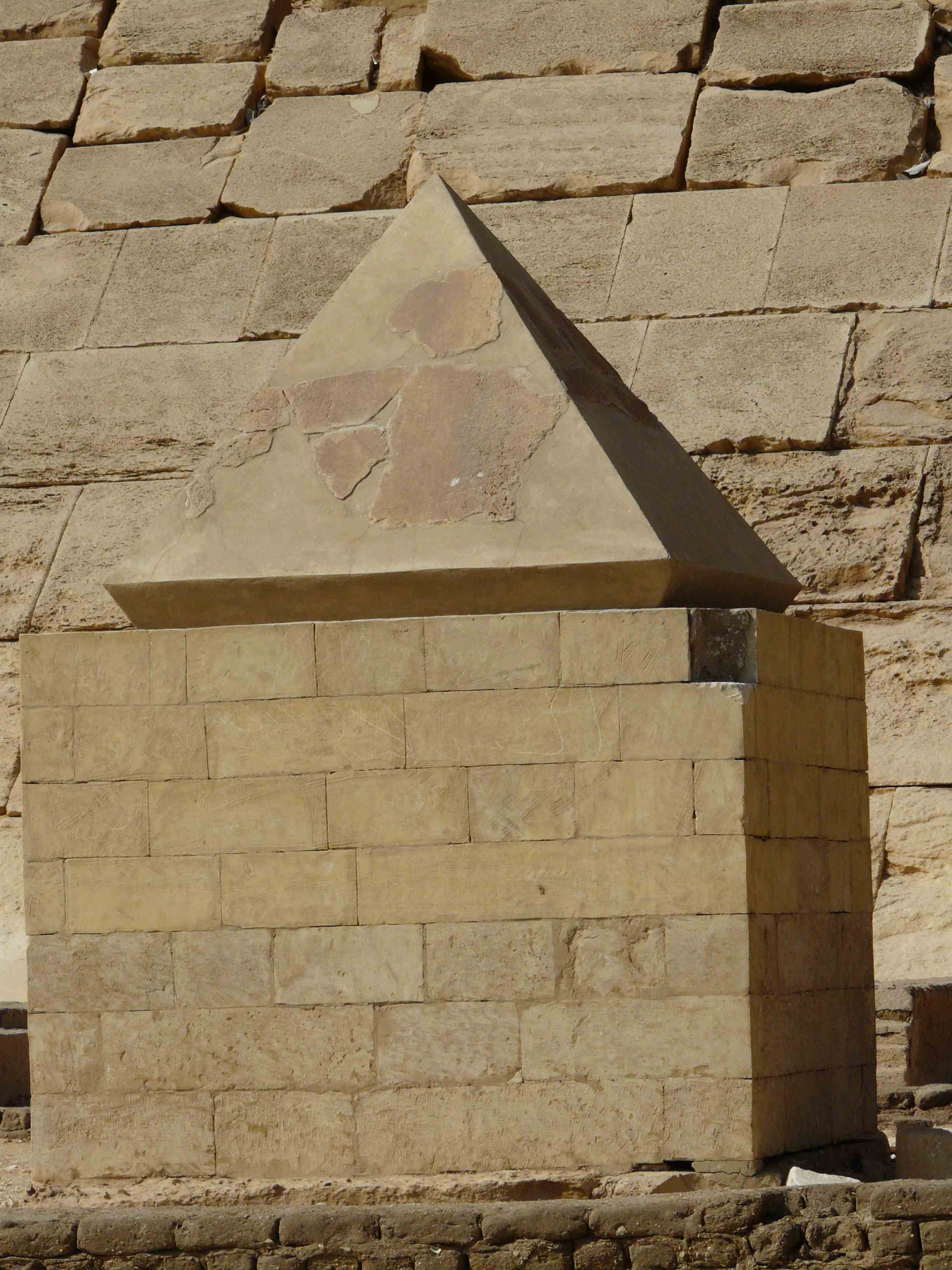
Pyramidion reconstructed from fragments found at the site

== See also ==
- Dashur Necropolis
- Fourth Dynasty
- List of tallest freestanding structures
- List of Egyptian pyramids
- List of megalithic sites
- List of tallest structures built before the 20th century
- Pyramid Construction
- Sneferu

== Bibliography ==
- Bárta, Miroslav (2005). "Location of the Old Kingdom Pyramids in Egypt". Cambridge Archaeological Journal. 15 (2): 177–191. doi:10.1017/s0959774305000090. S2CID 161629772.
- Lehner, Mark (2008). The Complete Pyramids. New York: Thames & Hudson. ISBN 978-0-500-28547-3.
- Mendelssohn, Kurt (1974). The Riddle of the Pyramids. Praeger. ISBN 978-0-500-05015-6.
- Müller-Römer, Frank. “A New Consideration of the Construction Methods of the Ancient Egyptian Pyramids.” Journal of the American Research Center in Egypt 44 (2008): 113–40. http://www.jstor.org/stable/27801624.
- Krauss, Rolf (1996). "The Length of Sneferu's Reign and How Long It Took to Build the 'Red Pyramid'". The Journal of Egyptian Archaeology. 82. Egypt Exploration Society: 43–48. doi:10.2307/3822113. ISSN 0307-5133.
- Romer, John (2007). The Great Pyramid: Ancient Egypt Revisited. Cambridge University Press, Cambridge. ISBN 978-0-521-87166-2.
- Seidlmayer, Stephan Johannes 2024. Dahschur, Ägypten: Ausgrabungen im Friedhof der Pyramidenstadt der Roten Pyramide. Die Arbeiten der Jahre 2022 bis 2024. e-Forschungsberichte des Deutschen Archäologischen Instituts 2024 (2), 1-19.
- Verner, Miroslav (2001d). The Pyramids: The Mystery, Culture and Science of Egypt's Great Monuments. New York: Grove Press. ISBN 978-0-8021-1703-8.

Records
Preceded by Bent Pyramid	World's tallest structure c. 2590 BCE–2570 BCE; 104 m	Succeeded by Great Pyramid of Giza
