= Bent Pyramid =

Egyptian pyramid built by Sneferu

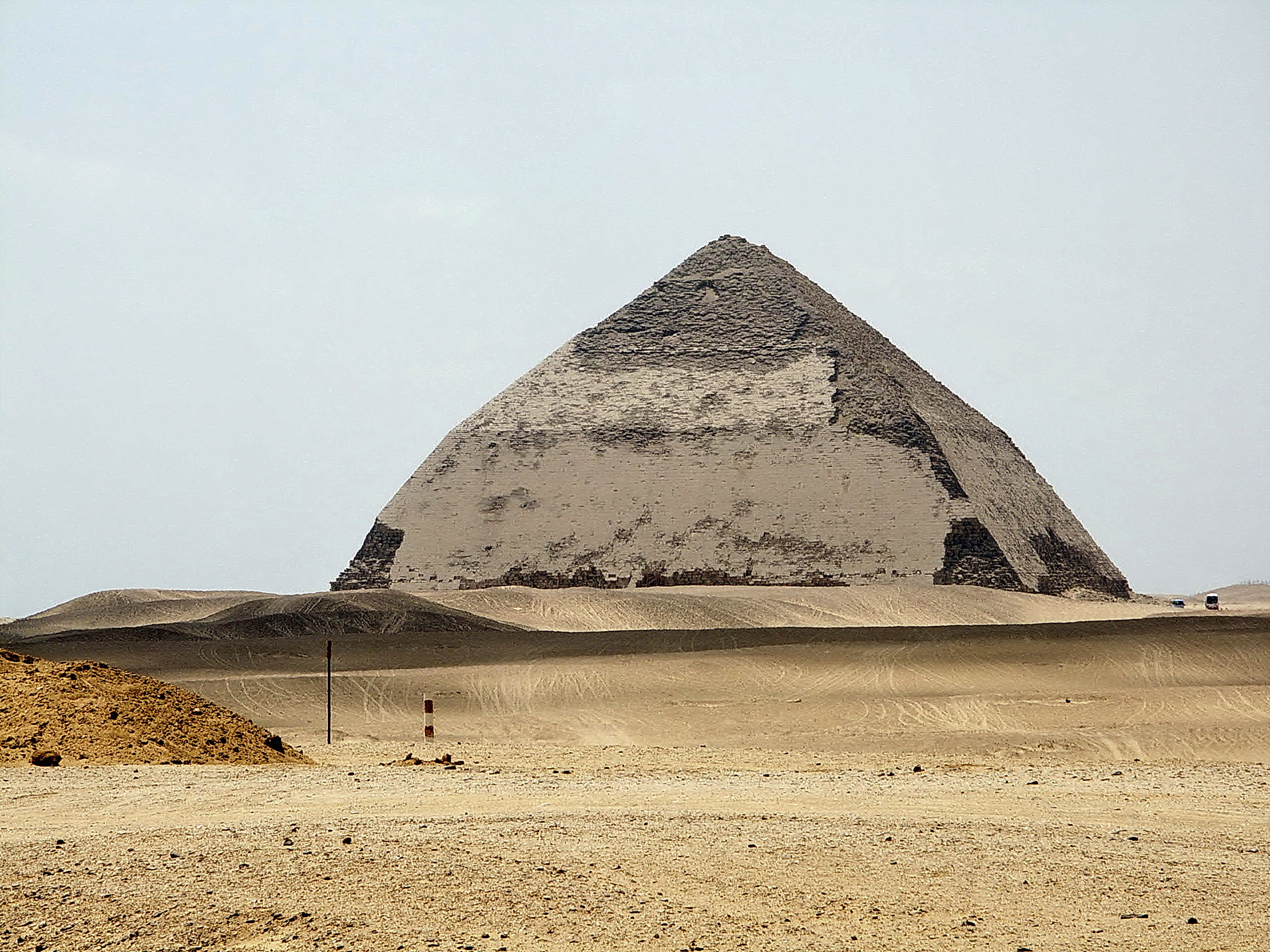
- Sneferu's bent pyramid at Dahshur, an early experiment in true pyramid building, 2004

- Location within Egypt
- 29°47′25″N 31°12′33″E
- Owner: Sneferu
Ancient name
< S29 F35 D21 G43 > N28 O24 M24or< S29 F35 D21 G43 > N28 D36 O24 M24
Niswt Ḫˁ Snfrw
Nesut Kha Sneferu
"Sneferu Shines in the South"
"The Southern Shining Pyramid"
- Constructed: c. 2600 BC (4th dynasty)
- Type: Bent pyramid
- Material: Limestone
- Height: 104.71 metres (344 ft; 200 cu); 47.04 metres (154 ft; 90 cu) beneath bend; 57.67 metres (189 ft; 110 cu) above bend
- Base: 189.43 metres (621 ft; 362 cu) at base; 123.58 metres (405 ft; 236 cu) at bend
- Volume: 1,237,040 cubic metres (43,685,655 ft^{3})
- Slope: 54°27′44″ below bend; 43°22′ above bend

The Bent Pyramid is an ancient Egyptian pyramid located at the royal necropolis of Dahshur, approximately 40 kilometres (25 mi) south of Cairo, built under the Old Kingdom Pharaoh Sneferu. A unique example of early pyramid development in Egypt, this was the second of three pyramids built by Sneferu.

The Bent Pyramid rises from the desert at a 54-degree inclination, but the top section (above 47 metres [154 ft]) is built at the shallower angle of 43 degrees, lending the pyramid a visibly "bent" appearance.

== Overview ==
Comparison of approximate profiles of the Bent Pyramid with some notable pyramidal or near-pyramidal buildings. Dotted lines indicate original heights, where data is available. In its SVG file, hover over a pyramid to highlight and click for its article.

The Bent Pyramid represents a change from the step-sided pyramids of before to smooth-sided pyramids. It has been suggested that due to the steepness of the original angle of inclination the structure may have begun to show signs of instability during construction, forcing the builders to adopt a shallower angle to avert the structure's collapse. This theory appears to be borne out by the fact that the adjacent Red Pyramid, built immediately afterwards by Sneferu, was constructed at an angle of 43 degrees from its base. This fact also contradicts the theory that at the initial angle the construction would take too long because Sneferu's death was nearing, so the builders changed the angle to complete the construction in time. In 1974, Kurt Mendelssohn suggested the change of the angle to have been made as a stability precaution in reaction to a catastrophic collapse of the Medium Pyramid while it was still under construction.

Since Mendelsohn, authors urged stability problems the reason for the unusual bent shape, supported by the obviously damaged stones in the interior and the fact parts of the interior remained unfinished. This hypothesis contradicts the fact that there are no signs for deformations at this pyramid, even the curved flanks of the Cheops Pyramid have not been observed here. As the idea of a sloped pyramid was totally new, it is possible that the iconic design of later pyramids only emerged after a process in which the Dahshur pyramids are steps towards the perfect result. The sun temples of Abu Sir and the obelisks of the New Kingdom also had the shape of a bent pyramid. Another explanation for the reduction of the slope is the building process with the utilization of ramps. The most challenging part of ramp construction was the top, becausing maneuvering space became tight there..

The Bent Pyramid was the second pyramid project by king Sneferu who constructed three pyramids in his long reign, all of them of changed shape and the result of lessons learnt from the previous building in the continuous search for the perfect symbol and tomb which only his son Cheops was determined to achieve. The three buildings reflect an experimental stadium of the pyramid program that made its eventual climax possible. Whether the building decisions coincide with changes in religious concepts is hypothetical. For example, the shift from the step pyramid to the slant pyramid can be interpreted as the royal tomb was no longer considered as a staircase to the stars; instead, it was served as a symbol of the solar cult and of the primeval mound from which all life sprang. It is also unique among the approximately 118 pyramids to be found in Egypt, in that its original polished limestone outer casing remains largely intact. The fact this is the steepest of the classical pyramids made stone robbery too dangerous. British structural engineer Peter James attributes this to larger clearances between the parts of the casing than used in later pyramids; these imperfections would work as expansion joints and prevent the successive destruction of the outer casing by thermal expansion.

The ancient formal name of the Bent Pyramid is generally translated as (The)-Southern-Shining-Pyramid, or Sneferu-(is)-Shining-in-the-South. In July 2019, Egypt decided to open the Bent Pyramid for tourism for the first time since 1965. Tourists are able to reach two 4,600-year-old chambers through a 79-metre (259 ft) narrow tunnel built from the northern entrance of the pyramid. The 18-metre-high (59 ft) "side pyramid", which is assumed to have been built for Sneferu's wife Hetepheres will also be accessible. It is the first time this adjacent pyramid has been opened to the public since its excavation in 1956.

== Construction phases ==
The Pyramid underwent three construction phases. In the first construction phase, a steep pyramid with a base length of 157 meters and an inclination angle of approximately 58° (possibly even 60°) was planned. If the pyramid had been completed in this form, it would have reached a height of around 125 meters, but given the knowledge of ancient techniques and the comparison with completed pyramids, such a steep pyramid was probably not a realistic option and did not exceed only few stone layers. If it was clear to the builders that this was unrealistic, the bent shape was intended from the beginning. Due to the good overall degree of preservation of the pyramid, this phase can only be proven indirectly through offset points around 12.70 m from the entrance in the lower descending corridor and at around 11.60 meters in the upper descending corridor.

The second phase was an extension in volume with a reduced angle of inclination of 54°. The base length was increased to 188 m. Here, too, inclined wall layers were used as it was practice at the step pyramids, because masons were not able to produce trapezoid stones at this phase and turned to this technique at the Bent Pyramid for the first time. While step pyramids were built in ring-shaped shells of slant layers, the turn to undivided masonry made horizontal layers more practicable. If the inclination of 54° until the top was ever intended, the building would have reached a height of 129.4 m and a volume of around 1,524,000 cubic meters. The Bent Pyramid would therefore be the third highest pyramid in the world. However, this inclination was not continued beyond a height of 49 m. The masonry of this phase is faced with fine Tura limestone.

In the third construction phase, the angle was reduced to 43° and, like in the Red Pyramid and all successive pyramids, the masonry was laid in horizontal layers. The slope reduction created the unique kink that is not found in any other pyramid. Due to the lower inclination angle of the upper part, the total height was reduced to 105 m. The total volume was 1,440,808 cubic meters. The upper area also has a cladding of fine Tura limestone. Going back to Mendelsohn's theory, some authors argue the reduced angle was intended to reduce the building weight as a reaction to stability concerns the builders observed. In such a case, one should expect supporting structures in the interiors would be strengthened, while the upper building would be stopped, but the contrary happened: the interior was left unfinished while the building continued. Another tens of thousands of tons of stone were still added to the construction, only roughly a third less than without the inclination of the slope. Another study explains the reduction of the slope on geometric concerns in regard to ramp building. The maneuvering space for ramps was extremely limited at the top of pyramids with a slope of 52° (as at Meidum and Giza), whereas it became geometrically impossible at a steeper incline, and the experiments with different gradients at the Dahshur pyramids document the process to deal with this problem.

== Interior passages and chambers ==
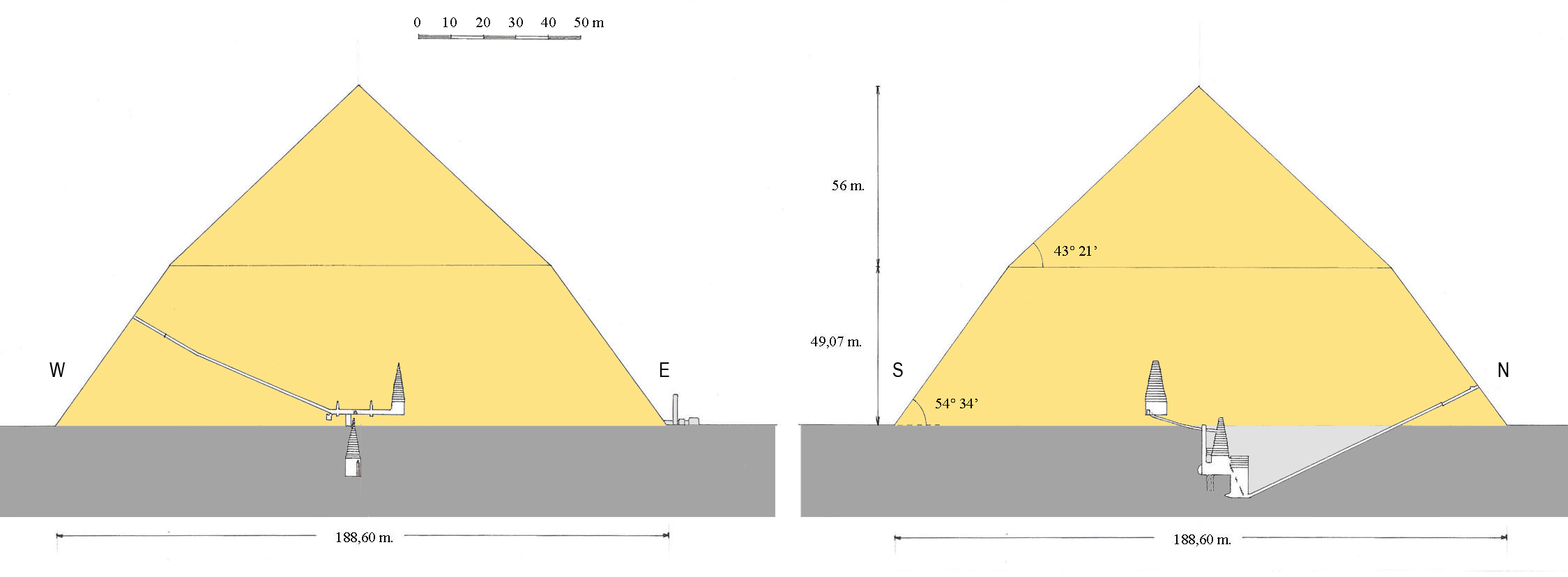
Showing the two entrances into the bent pyramid

The Bent Pyramid has two entrances connected with two separate chamber systems. One entrance passage starts fairly low down on the north side, to which a substantial wooden stairway has been built for the convenience of tourists. The second entrance is high on the west face of the pyramid.

The entrance to the lower chamber system is located at 11.80 m above ground today. A 74 m long passage with a slope of 25°, 1.05 m high and 1.10 m wide, is leading downward to a partly subterranean antechamber of 12.60 m height and 5.40 length, with the width of the corridor. It is covered by a corbelled roof of fine limestone. In the height of 6.50 m, accessible by a modern wooden staircase, a short corridor leads to the burial chamber of 4.96 by 4.30 m, covered by a corbelled roof of 17.20. There are no signs of a burial procedure. A short corridor leads to a shaft, mostly called "chimney", right at the pyramid axis; both corridor and shaft are covered by another corbelled roof. A hole in the roof of the northern chamber (accessed today by a high and rickety ladder 15 m (50 ft) long) leads via a rough connecting passage to the passage from the western entrance.

The entrance to the upper chamber systems begins at 33.32 m height at the west side. A passage of 67.66 m leads down ending in a horizontal section blocked by two stone blocks which were not lowered vertically, as in other pyramids, but slid down 45° ramps to block the passage. One of these was lowered in antiquity and a hole has been cut through it, the other remains propped up by a piece of ancient cedar wood. The connecting passage referenced above enters the passage between the two portcullises.. The upper burial chamber of 7.97 m by 5.26 m has a four-sided corbelled roof of 16.50 m height. It was obviously near finished, the stones are left rough, cracks were covered by gypsum. One block in this chamber is inscribed by the hieroglyphs of Sneferu which allowed to link the building to him. A sarcophagus was not found. A particular feature in the chambers are a row of original cedar beams that were interpreted by many as a reaction on structural problems. In contradiction to that, Edwards argues the cedar beams rather had been part of the funerary support structure and, some of them bedded in mortar, could not have any structural function.

== Causeway ==
A causeway leads from the Bent Pyramid's northeast toward the pyramid with the valley temple. The causeway was paved with limestone blocks that went 700 meters into the pyramid's court and had a low limestone wall on each side. For this reason of the causeway having low walls it made it so that sand would drift up it and would make it hard to enter or impossible to reenter without clearing out the sand, so there was a small bar wall that was placed with a staircase that led up into the Bent Pyramid. This led later for builders of the causeways to change how they were built and no longer leave the causeways open to the elements and to cover the causeways. The exit from the causeway leads into the pyramids court and was 2.80 meters wide. In fact, there may have been a second causeway that led down to a dock or landing stage, but there is no excavation that can prove this assumption yet.

== Valley Temple ==
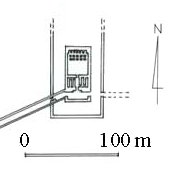
Image of the Valley Temple of the Bent Pyramid

The valley temple of the Bent Pyramid was very different from the other known valley temples. The reason for that was it had beveled edges, with structures that had pillars where they had decorated reliefs with exception to the front row of the temples structure that faced toward the chapel. The Valley temple is 26.20 meters wide and 47.16 meters long (50 by 90 cubits). The Valley temple front faces south and helps to form the northern boundary of the court. The Valley temple is divided into three sections the first and last section has a cover over it and the section between them is an open court.

== Pyramid temple ==
On the east side of the Bent Pyramid, there are the fragmentary remains of the pyramid temple. Like the pyramid temple of the Meidum Pyramid, there are two stelae behind the temple, though of these only stumps remain. There is no trace of inscription to be seen. The temple remains are fragmentary, but it is presumed to be similar to that of the Meidum temple.

== Satellite pyramid ==
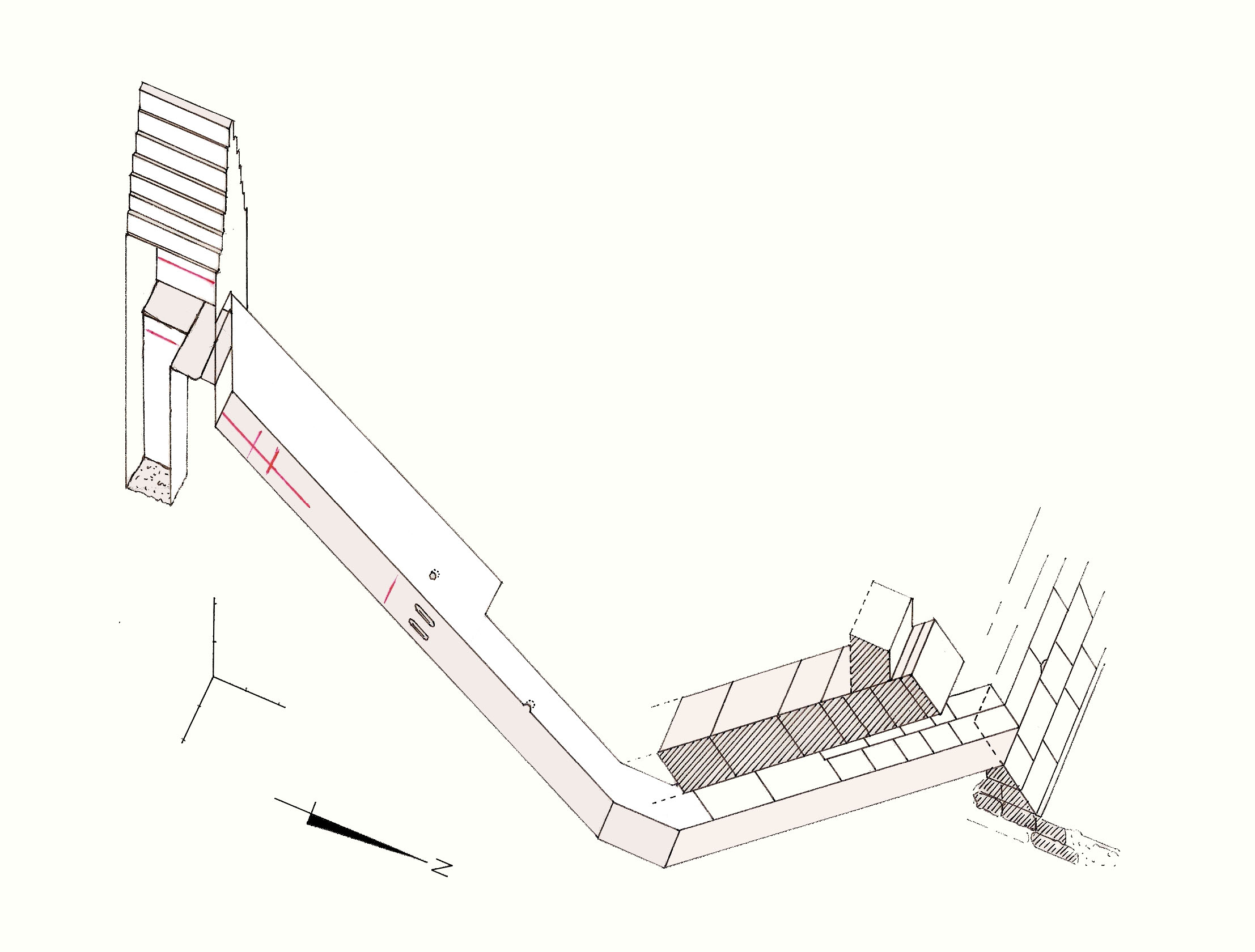
An axonometric projection of the inside of the satellite pyramid

A satellite pyramid, suggested by some Egyptologists to have been built to house the pharaoh's ka, is located 55 metres (180 ft) south of the Bent Pyramid. The satellite pyramid originally measured 26 metres (85 ft) in height and 52.80 metres (173.2 ft) in length, with faces inclining 44°30'. (Note: Nearly identical to the inclination of the Red Pyramid) The structure is made of limestone blocks, relatively thick, arranged in horizontal rows and covered with a layer of fine limestone from Tura. The burial chamber is accessible from a descending corridor with its entrance located 1.10 metres (3 ft 7 in) above the ground in the middle of the north face. The corridor, inclined at 34°, originally measured 11.60 metres (38.1 ft) in length. A short horizontal passage connects the corridor with an ascending corridor, inclined at 32° 30', leading up to the chamber.

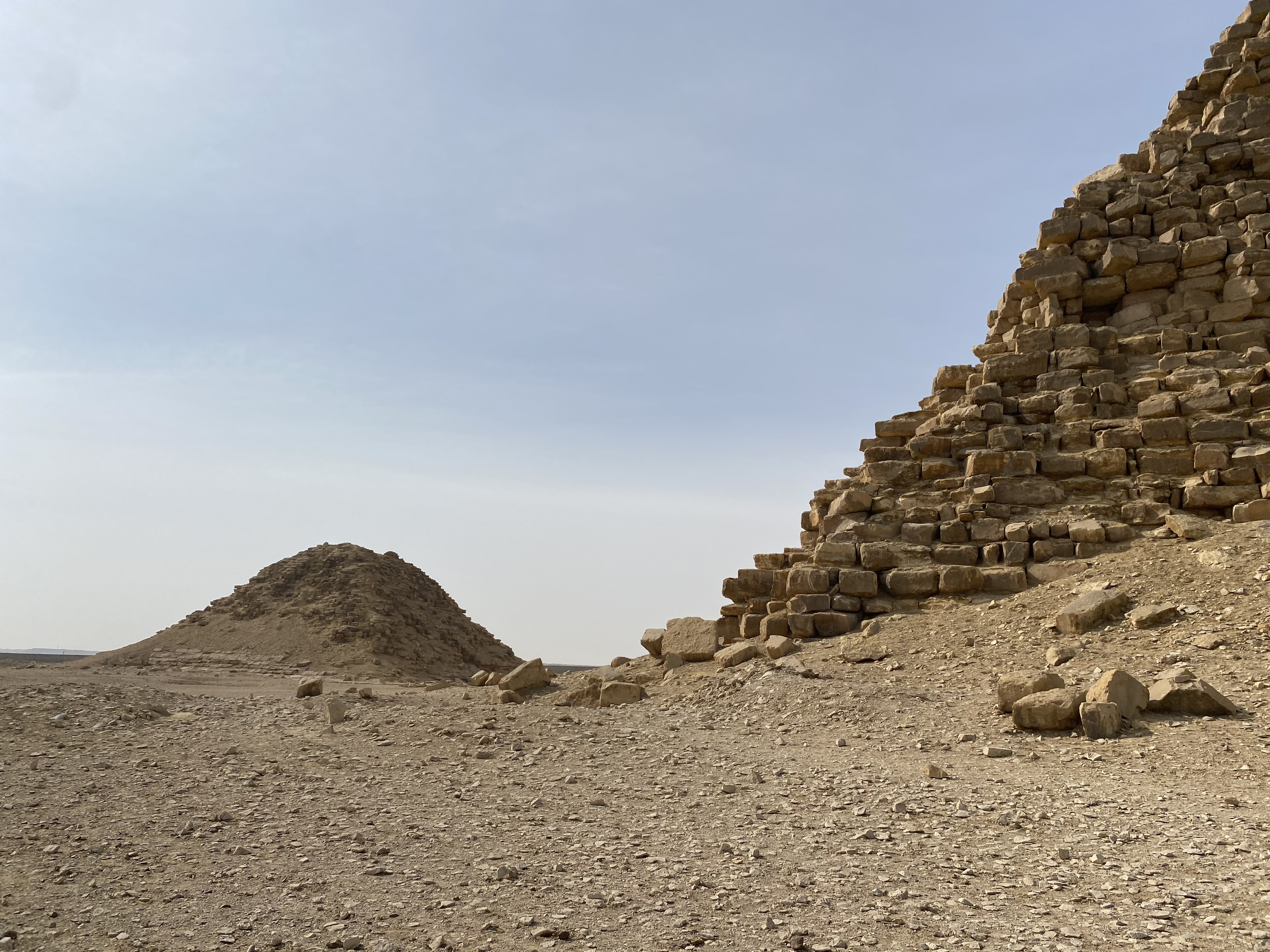
The Bent pyramid with its satellite pyramid, 2021

The design of the corridors is similar to the one found in the Great Pyramid of Giza, where the Grand Gallery takes up the place of the ascending corridor. The corridor leads up to the burial chamber (called this despite that it most probably never contained any sarcophagus). The chamber, located in the center of the pyramid, has a corbel vault ceiling and contains a four metres deep shaft, probably dug by treasure hunters, in the southeast part of the chamber.

Like the main pyramid, the satellite had its own altar with two stelae located at the eastern side.

== Man-made landscape ==
As the first geometrically "true" pyramid in the world, the Bent Pyramid is also connected to the surrounding landscape. Nicole Alexanian and Felix Arnold, two distinguished German archeologists, provided a new insight to the meaning and function of the Bent Pyramid in their book The complex of the Bent Pyramid as a landscape design project. They noticed that the Bent Pyramid sits aside in a pristine desert area, rather than in a fertile area near the Nile River like all the other pyramids, and conclude that the landscape surrounding the Bent Pyramid must be man-made. When the archaeologists studied the landscape closely, the plateau of the pyramid seemed to be leveled artificially, with a nearby escarpment and trenches all being human-made. Moreover, a few traces of build-up were found, indicating an ancient garden enclosure. The impact of humans on the landscape is also present in a wadi channel connecting the Bent Pyramid to a harbor, which showed a distinct difference in level between the southern and northern sides of the channel. The southern slope also seemed to have been altered when the archaeologists compared it to the natural and twisting northern side. Arne Ramisch supported this idea by providing evidence that shows a low correlation of fraternal patterns of channel and natural topography on the southern side of the wadi channel.

The purpose of this man-made construction might have held mythical meaning and ritual function. Based on available evidence, the garden enclosure and water basins are both counterparts of funeral rites, which indicates a regular practice of rituals at Dahshur. However, there is also the implication that the garden enclosure helped to create a satisfactory living environment in the desert. In addition to that, the leveled plateau, quarried trenches on the western and southern sides of the pyramid, and nearby smaller tombs all come together to heighten the presence of the Bent Pyramid, aided by its long distance to the surrounding structures. These features imprinted the social hierarchy in the landscape and represented the power of the Egyptian King. Alexanian and Arnold describe the construction concisely: "an artificial mountain erected within an artificial landscape."

== Origin of the casing stones ==
A multi-author study has shed light on the question where the material of the casing of the Bent Pyramid originated from, and whether it is dressed stone or an early form of concrete. By examining NMR spectra it was shown that these stones consist of limestone from the Tura quarries, brought across from the opposite bank of the Nile and cemented with an artificial calcium-silicate binder, probably using diatomaceous earth from Fayium. This supports the latter theory.

== Graffiti ==
The graffiti found in the Bent Pyramid's temple was red in color, especially in the corners of the inner parts of the Bent Pyramid temple. Some being located on the pyramids enclosure and the offering temple. This graffiti is important to the tomb's history because it shows that the engravings and quarry marks were from the time period of Sneferu.

== Gallery ==
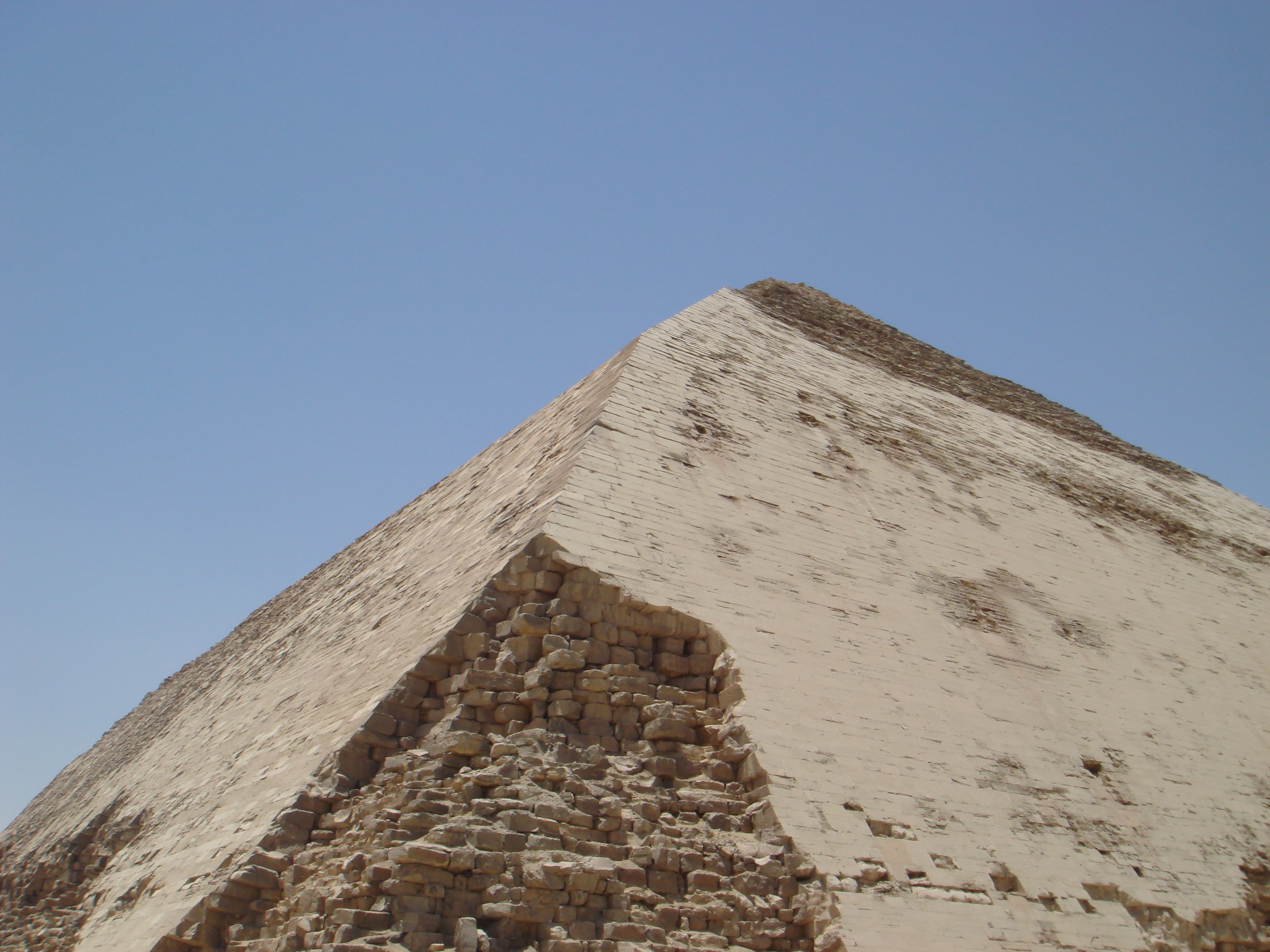
The 11 degree change in angle

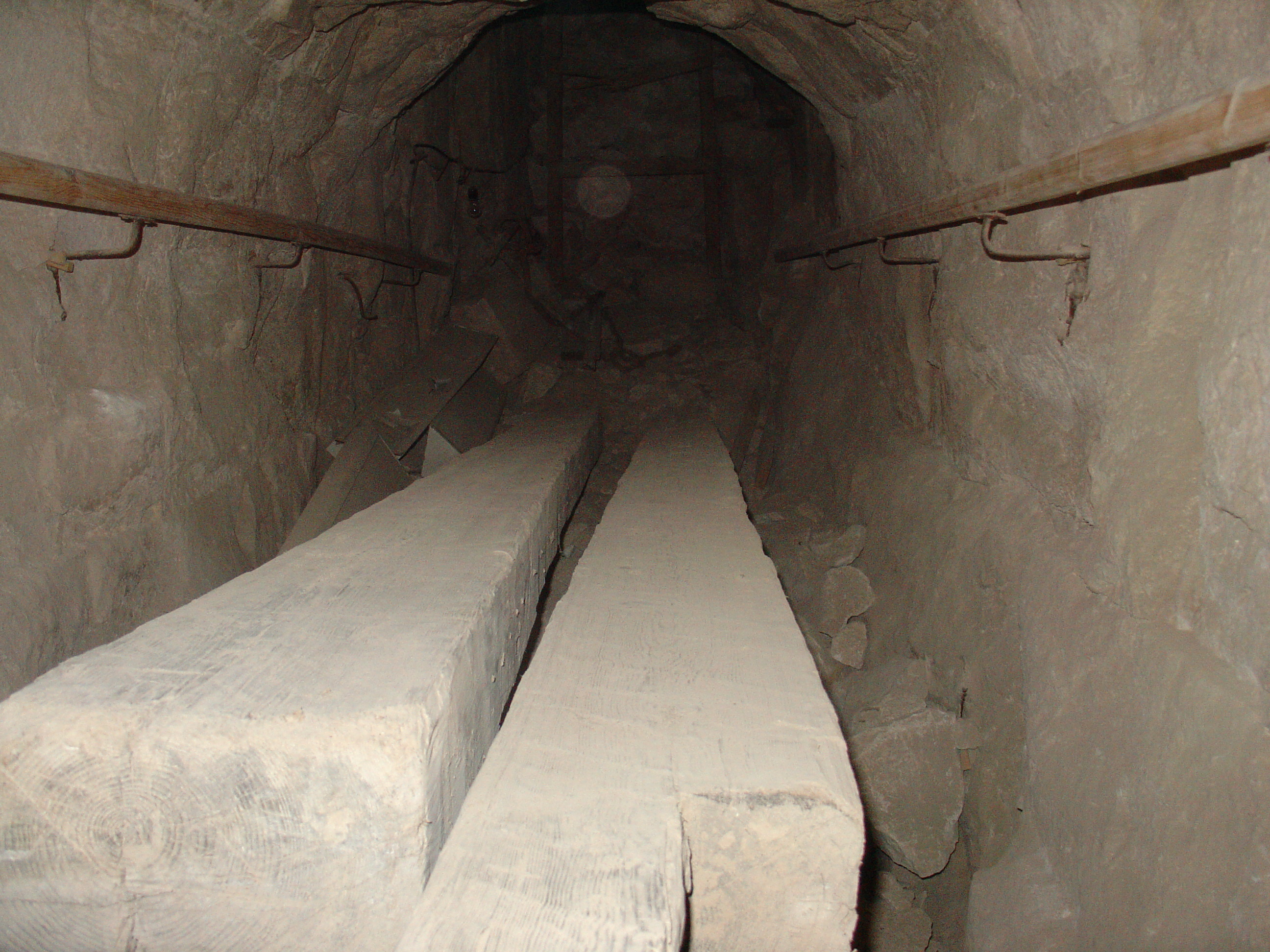
Wooden beams in the pyramid

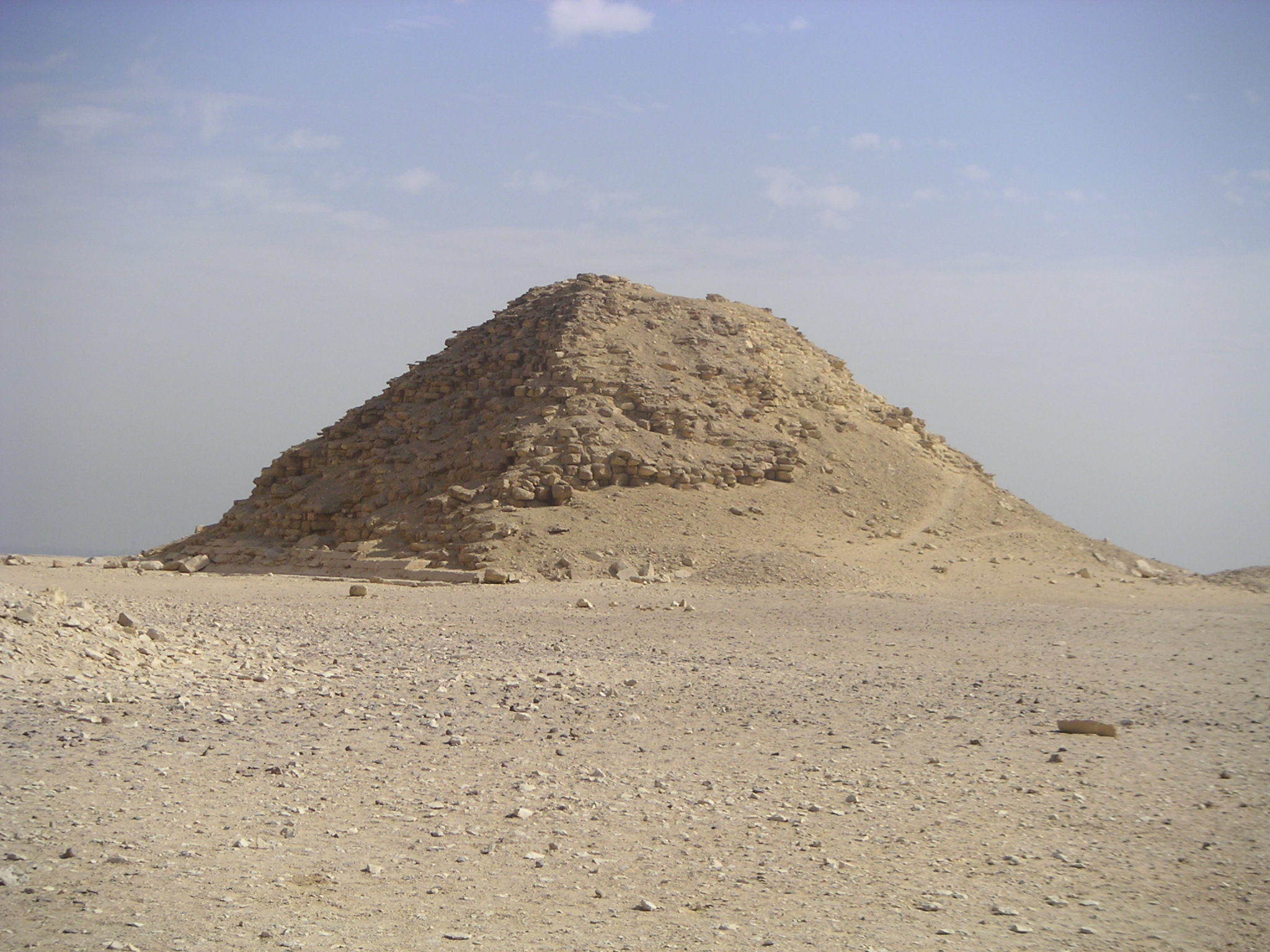
The satellite pyramid

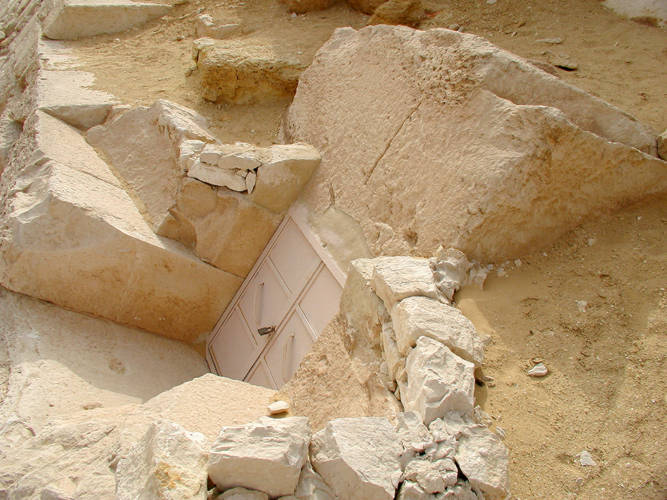
Entrance of the satellite pyramid

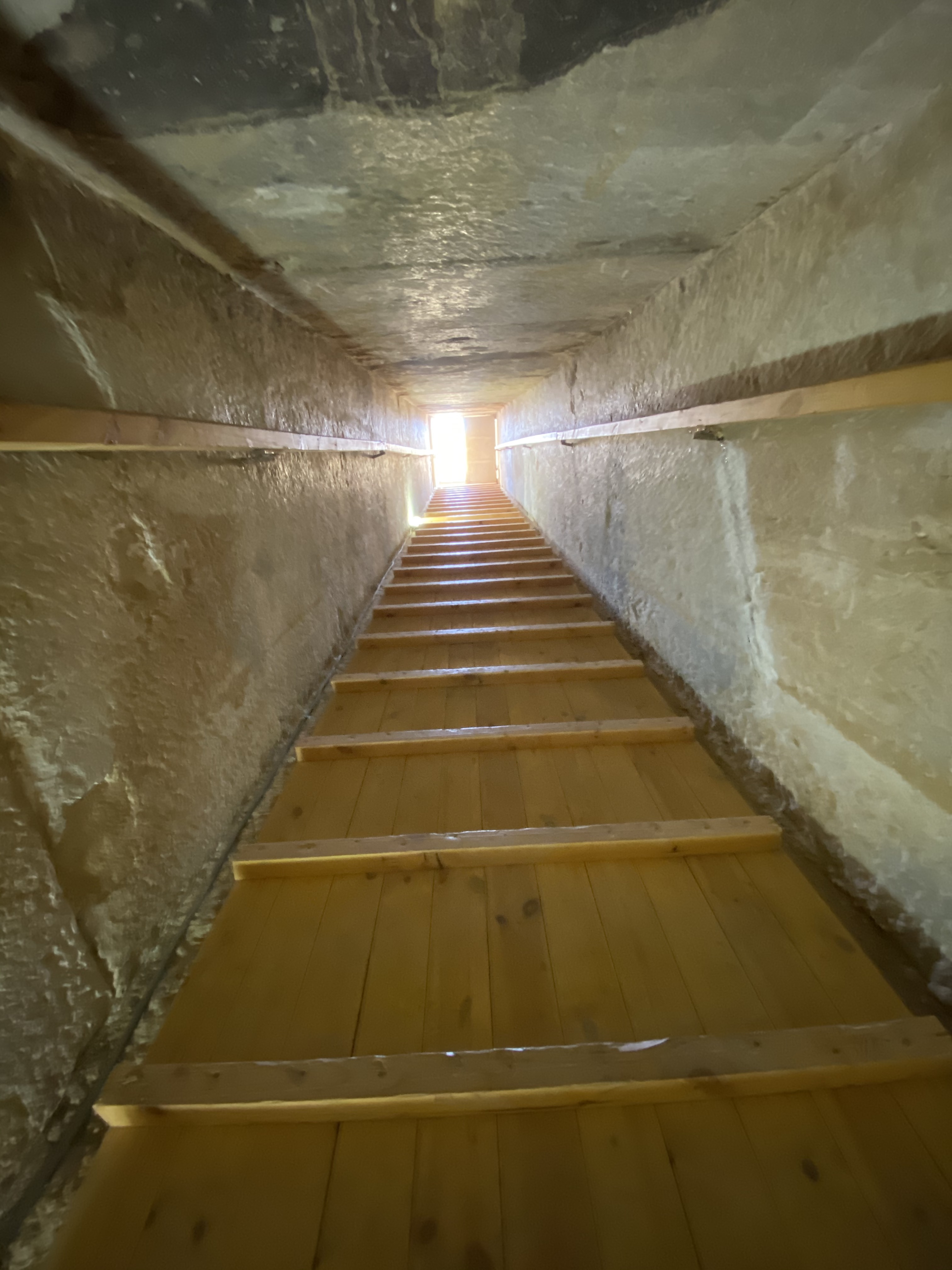
Descending passageway of the Bent Pyramid's Satellite pyramid.

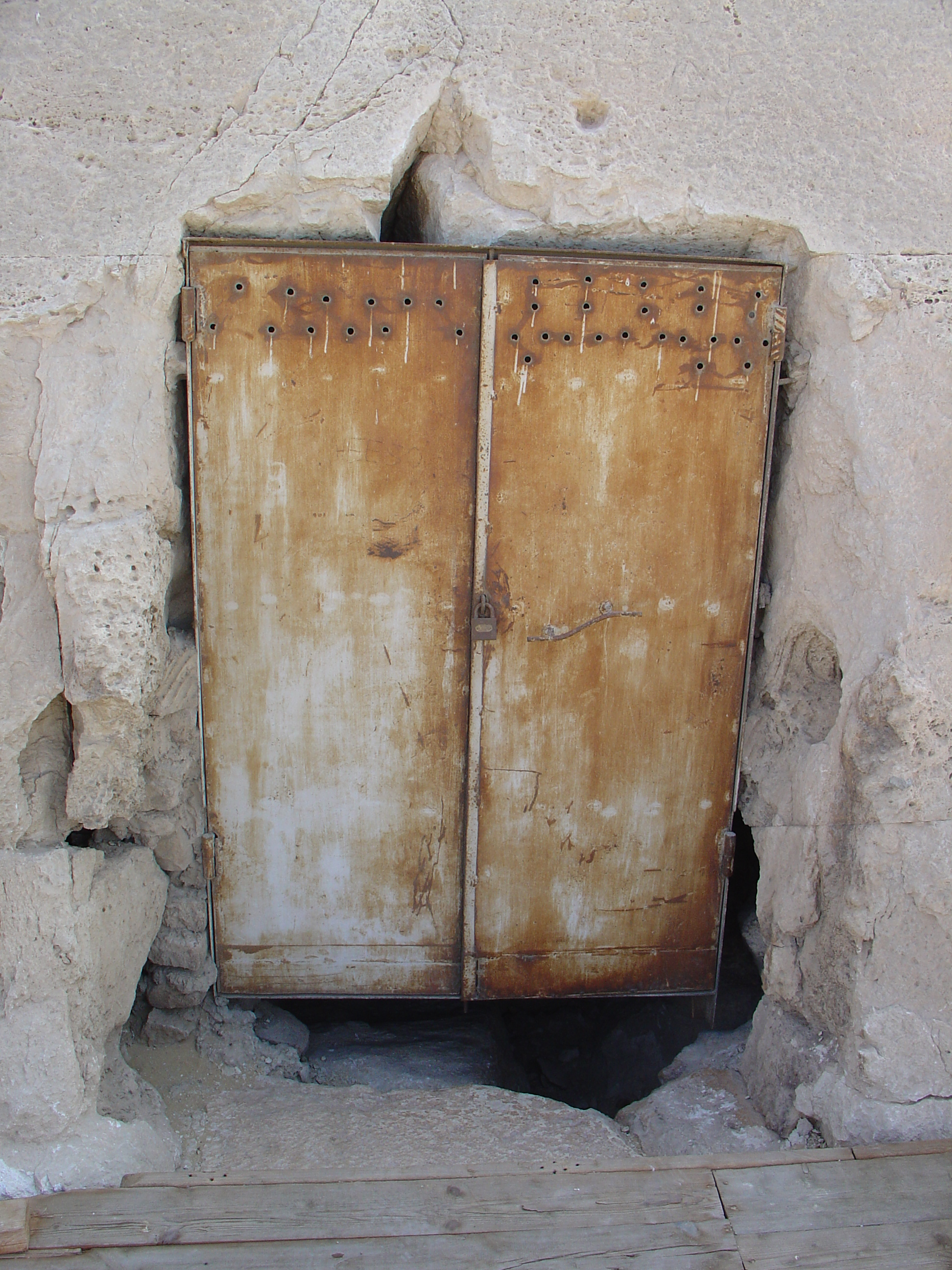
Entrance to the Bent Pyramid

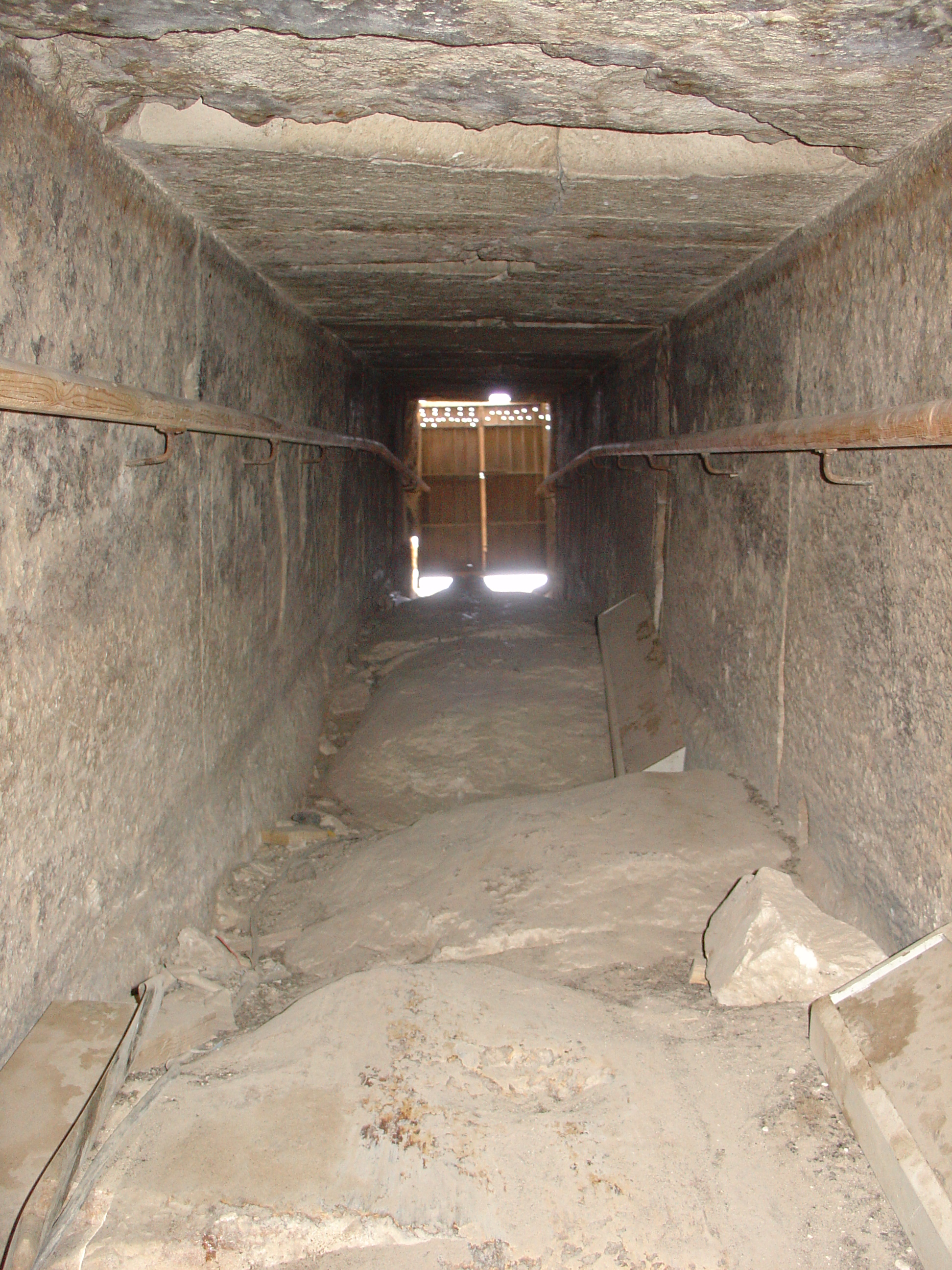
View of the outer door inside the pyramid

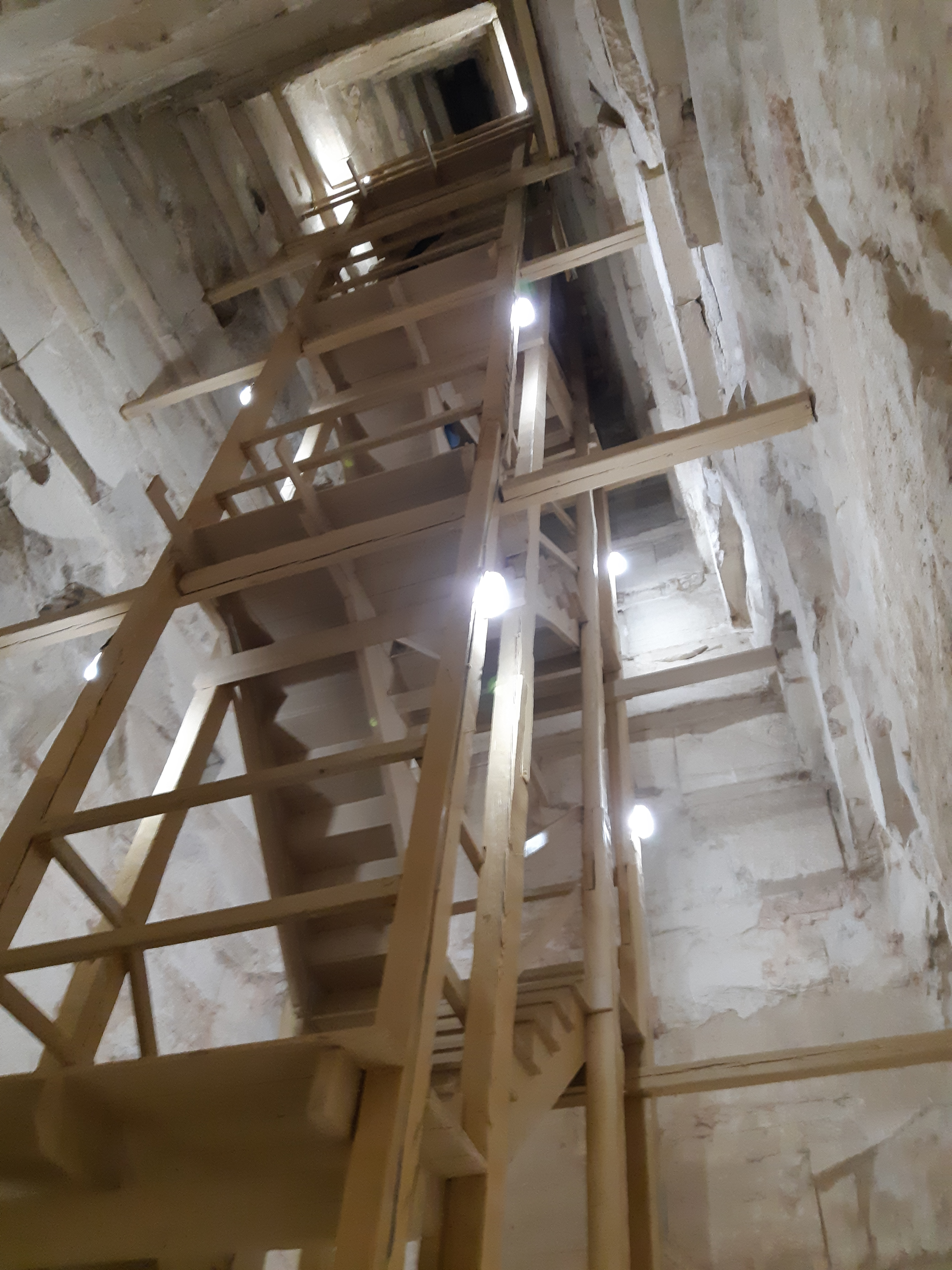
Vertical passage to the interior of the pyramid

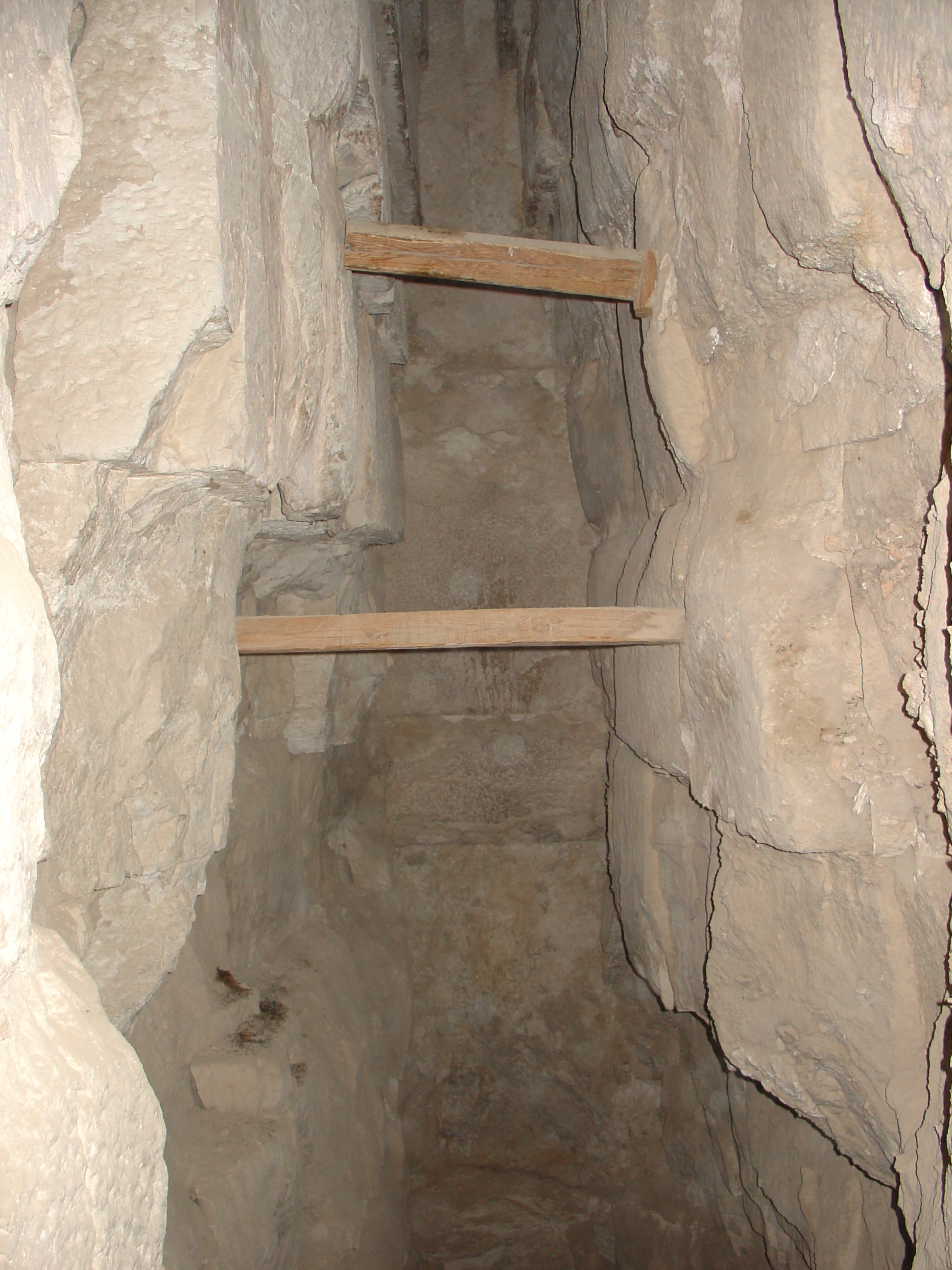
Stairways inside the pyramid

The edge of the pyramid plateau is well visible. It shows how it is isolated from the cultivated area.

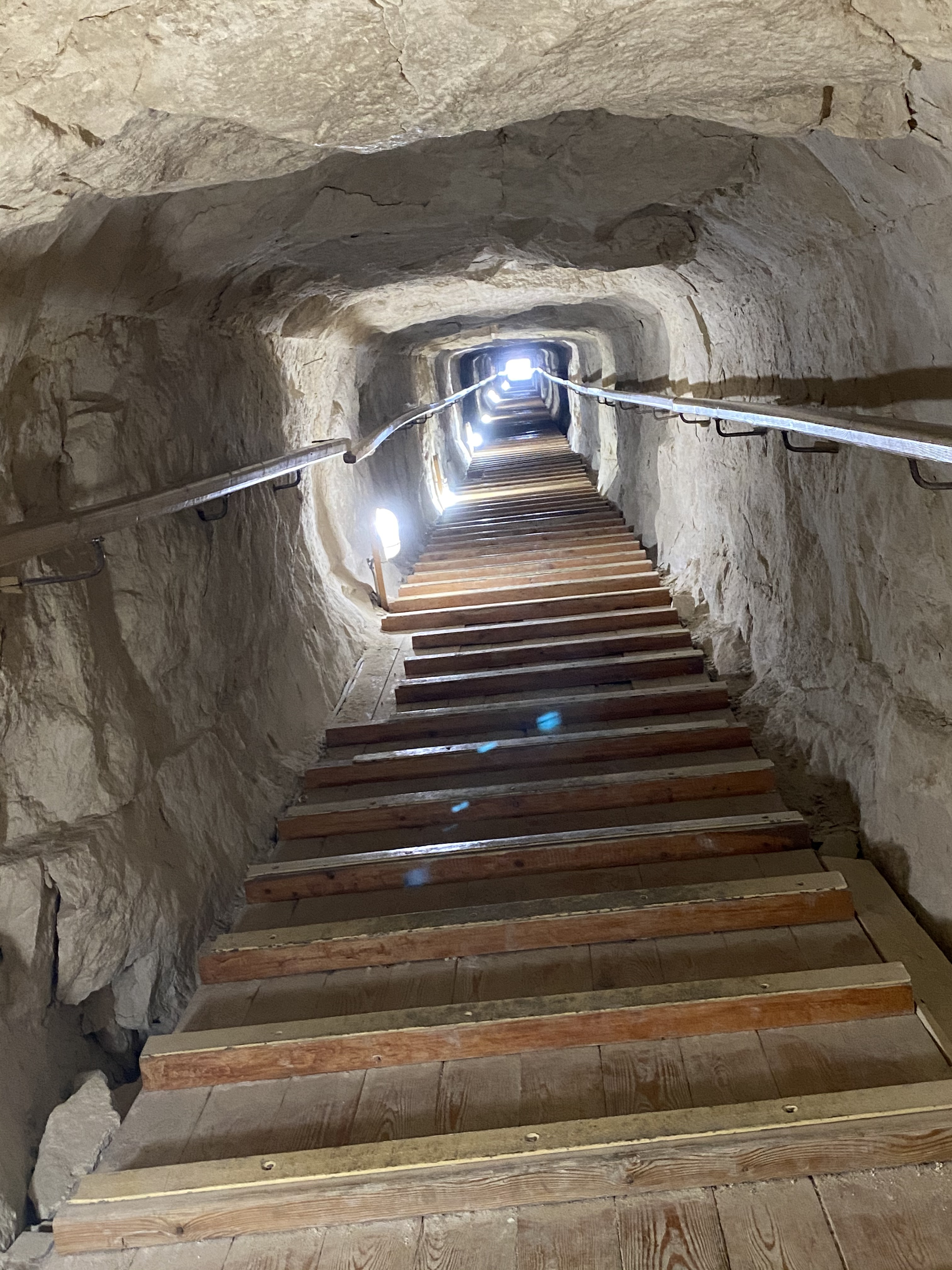
Descending passageway of the Bent Pyramid after installation of wooden staircase.

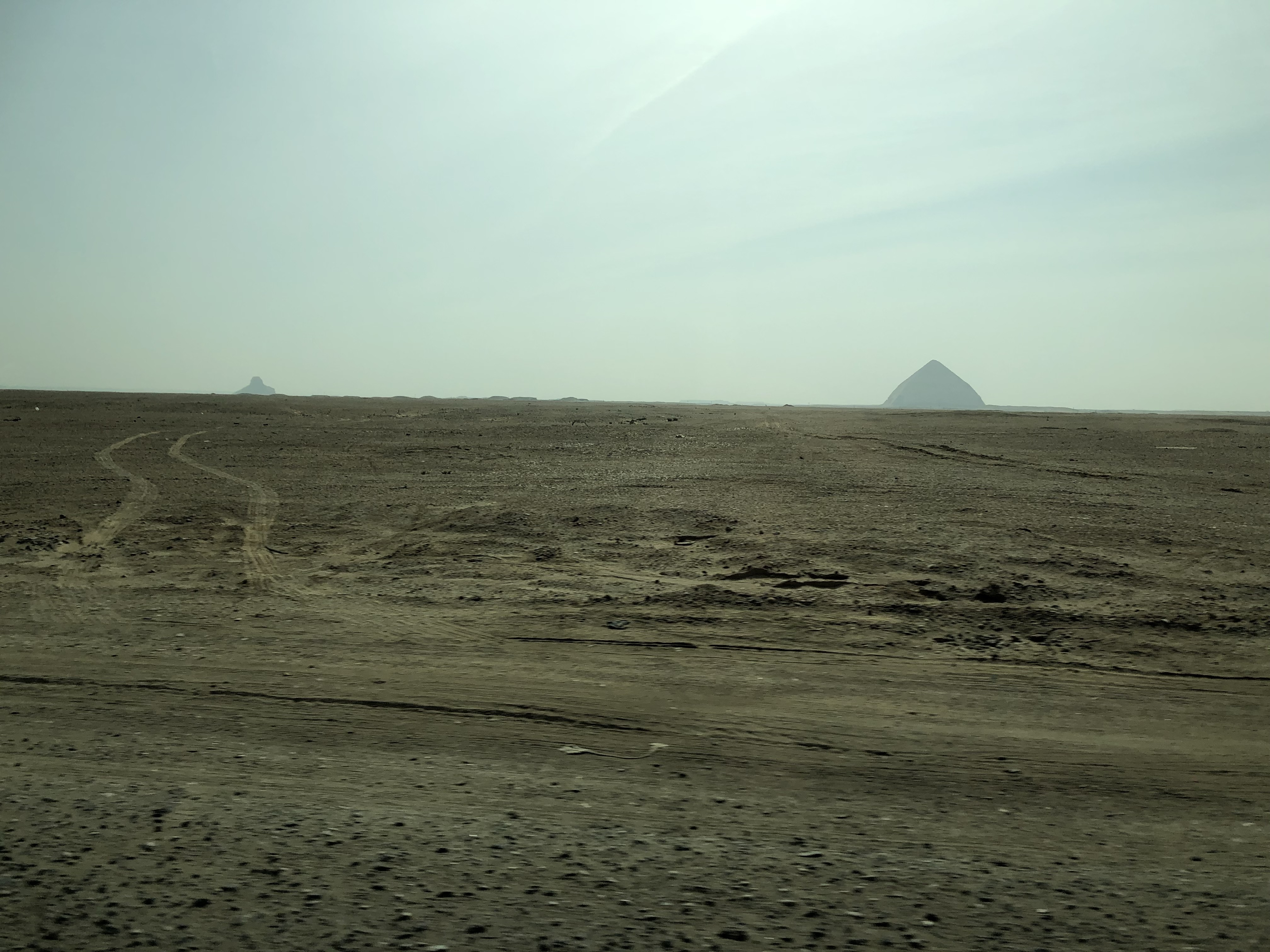
View of the Black pyramid and the Bent pyramid.

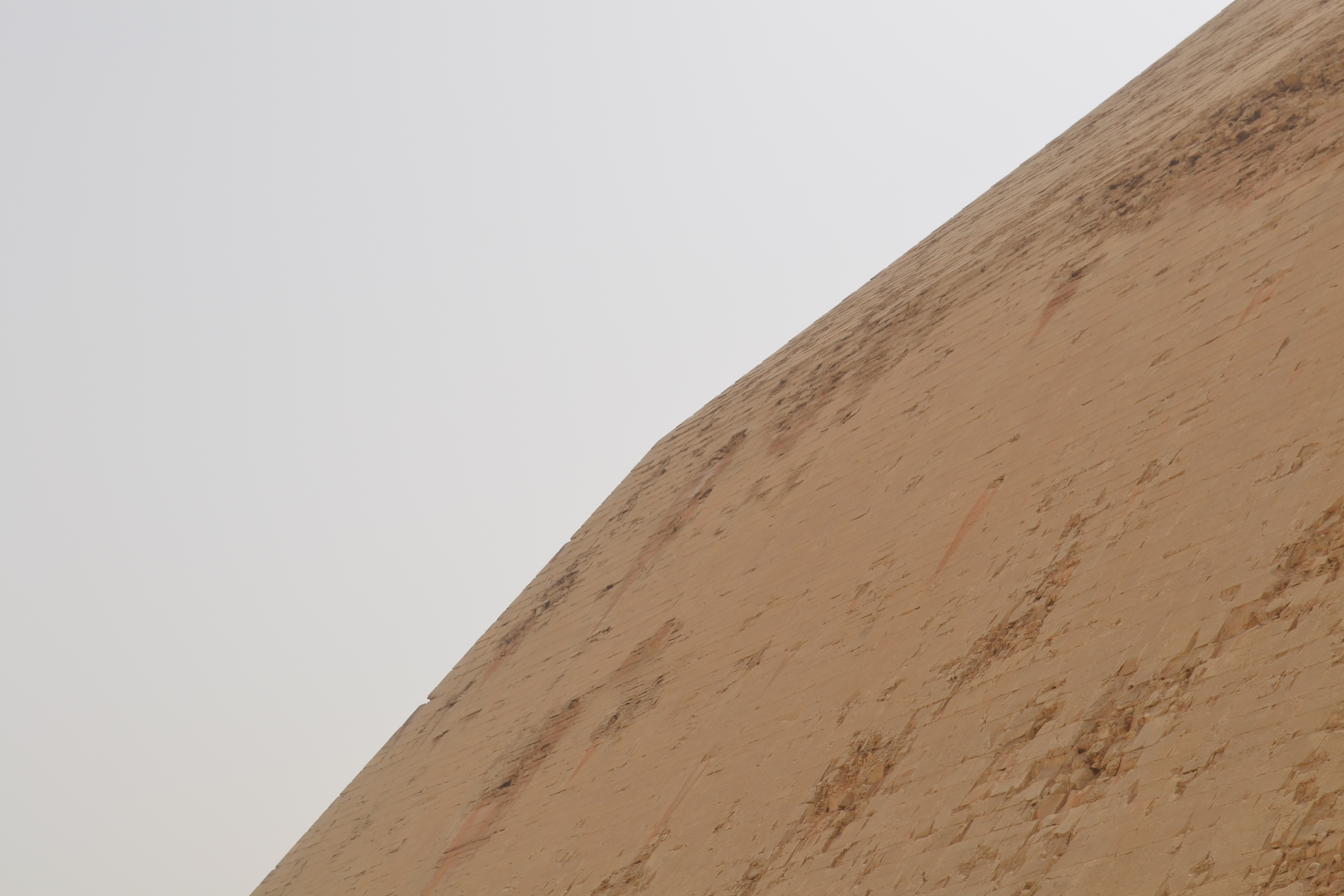

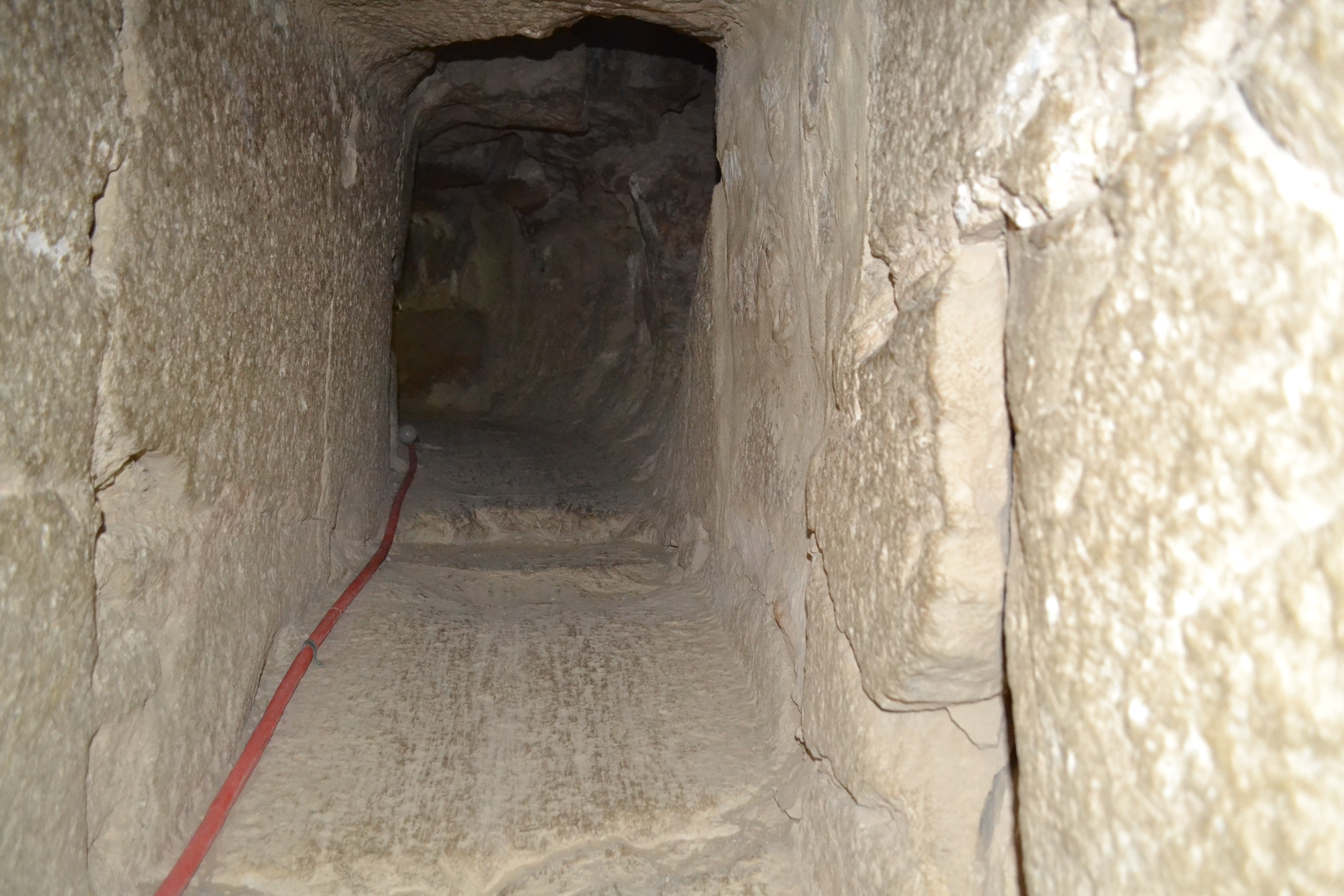
Passageway leading up to the tomb of Sneferu

== See also ==
- List of Egyptian pyramids
- List of megalithic sites
- Red Pyramid
- Pyramid of Amenemhat III (Dahshur)
- John Shae Perring

== Footnotes ==
Records
Preceded by Meidum Pyramid	World's tallest structure c. 2600 BCE – 2590 BCE; 101 m	Succeeded by Red Pyramid
