= Double Pyramid =

Smooth-sided pyramid

Double Pyramid / Lepsius XXV
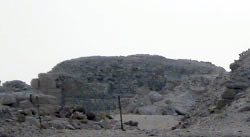
- The pyramid in 2008
- Interactive map of Double Pyramid / Lepsius XXV
- 29°53′35″N 31°12′11″E
Ancient name
D6 O24 O24
rś mrwj
Res Merwy
The Two [Pyramids] are Watchful
- Constructed: c. 2430 BC
- Type: mastaba or pyramid base
- Material: limestone
- Height: 6 meters
- Base: 1: 27.7 m × 21.53 m 2: 21.7 m × 15.7 m
- Slope: 78°

The Double Pyramid, also known as Lepsius XXV, designates a pair of adjacent monuments located on the south-eastern edge of the Abusir necropolis, south of the pyramid Lepsius XXIV and of the pyramid of Khentkaus II. The pair of monuments was built during the mid-Fifth Dynasty, likely during Nyuserre Ini's reign, for two female members of the extended royal family.

Because of its unique architectural characteristics, such as the absence of mortuary temple, a funerary chapel located inside the monument superstructure and a north-south descending corridor to the burial chamber, the monument is seen as a distinct type of Ancient Egyptian tomb, called a "double pyramid" by the Egyptologist Miroslav Verner. This conclusion is debated, with the Egyptologist Dušan Magdolen arguing that it is simply a double mastaba.

== Exploration ==
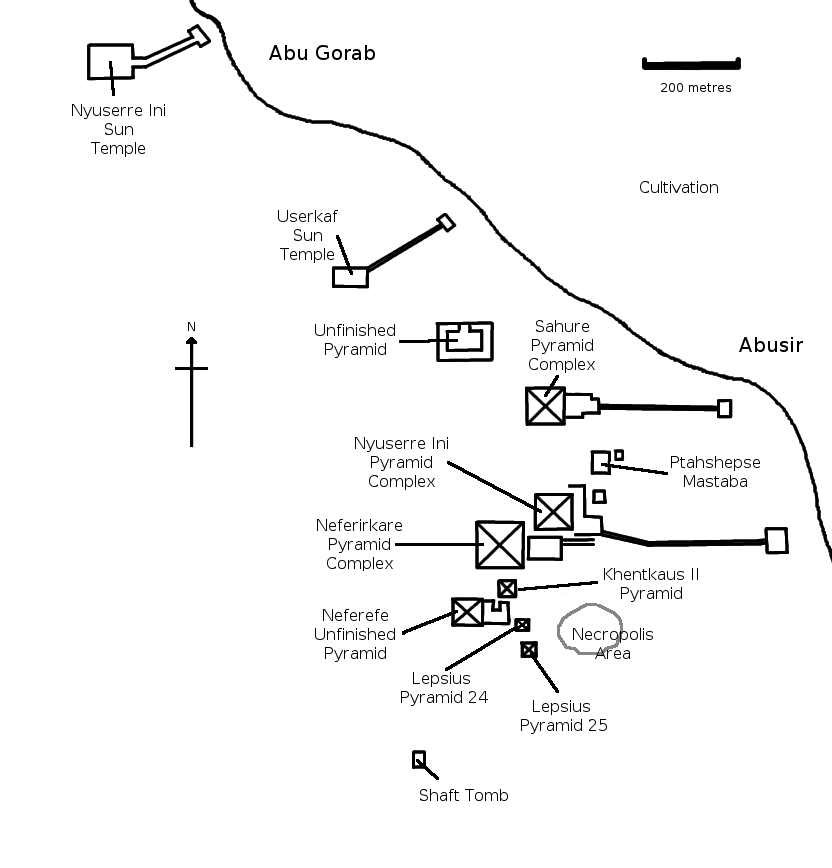
Location of Lepsius XXV in the necropolis of Abusir

On his Prussian Expedition to Egypt, the German archaeologist Karl Richard Lepsius located a small pyramid structure and included it in his list of pyramids as number XXV (25). Ludwig Borchardt classified it as a double mastaba in his research 60 years later, but he did not examine it any more closely.

Since for a long time no intensive research was conducted, the structure was believed to be the pyramid of a queen of the 5th Dynasty, similar to Lepsius XXIV directly to the north, although preliminary investigations appeared to indicate that the funerary temple was located, unusually, on the western side of the structure.

A Czech archaeological team led by Miroslav Verner conducted the first intensive excavation between 2001 and 2004, in which the unusual character of the structure as a "Double pyramid" became clear. Both sections of the structure have a slightly rectangular base plan, oriented in a north-south direction with extremely steep sides, which make it impossible that the structure was ever a true pyramid. In the masonry, a relatively large number of building inscriptions and marks were found. These included the name of the structure, which can be translated as "the two [pyramids] are watchful."

Dušan Magdolen questioned the classification of the building as a double pyramid and stressed the typological similarity of the remains to a mastaba. Among the points raised by Magdolen is the observation that neither the eastern nor the western tomb has a square plan, when all Egyptian pyramids, with the exception of the earliest one, that of Djoser, have square bases. In addition, Magdolen observes that the 78 degrees inclination of the walls of Lepsius XXV only falls within the normal range of mastabas and of step pyramids, while Lepsius XXV is clearly not the latter. Furthermore, some mastabas are known to have had a few architectural elements similar to those found in pyramids, in particular the north-south orientation of the descending corridor leading to the substructure as is the case here.

== Eastern tomb (Lepsius XXV/1) ==
=== Superstructure ===
The larger of the two tombs has a base measurement of 27.7 m x 21.53 m and is made of large blocks of white limestone. The outer walls, only roughly worked, had an incline of 78°, which indicates that the structure either took the form of a mastaba or a pyramid base, rather than a true pyramid. The height cannot be determined.

=== Substructure ===
The entranceway to the tomb chamber is a descending passage from the middle of the north side of the structure. The chamber itself measures 4.5 m x 2.7 m and ia on a north-south orientation. The sarcophagus is located in a niche on the west side of the chamber. Although the chamber itself has been thoroughly stripped by grave robbers, remains of the burial could be found. In addition to parts of a woman's remains, fragments of her limestone canopic jars and grave goods were found in the rubble of the chamber.

== West tomb (Lepsius XXV/2) ==
=== Superstructure ===
The smaller, west tomb's base measures 21.7 x 15.7 m and also has an incline of 78°. Thus, this portion appears also to have been a mastaba or truncated pyramid-like structure. Unlike the eastern tomb, the western one is made of roughly hewn grey limestone. It has experienced heavy spoliation, so that only a few layers remain today. The tomb probably did not ever have a cladding of fine white limestone. The stratification of the surviving masonry indicates that the west tomb was built after the eastern one.

=== Substructure ===
The underground structure of the western tomb has been thoroughly destroyed. Only the upper part of the descending passage, which was also on the north side, and the foundations of the tomb chamber survive now. This arrangement is typical for pyramids of this period. In the ruins of the tomb chamber, a very few traces of the burial of a woman were found, as well as a single object of the grave goods.

== Tomb complex ==
The excavations were able to show that there was no mortuary temple in the complex. The area that had erroneously been identified as a mortuary temple, turned out to be further remnants of the western tomb. However, there was an offering chapel on the east side of the eastern tomb. This chapel had an entrance on the southeastern corner which led through a vestibule to a single room. Part of the roof of the vestibule remains intact, so the height of the rooms of the chapel is known to have been about 5 metres. The chapel was originally clad with fine, white limestone, which was probably undecorated. This material has been almost entirely quarried away, but traces remain in the ground, from which the structure of the chapel could be reconstructed. In the ruins of the chapel, papyrus fragments of a list of offerings and an alabaster fragment of a female statue were found.

== Context ==
Since no inscriptions have been found with the name of the owner of the pyramid, the unusual structure cannot yet be exactly dated, despite the intensive excavations which have now taken place. The suggestion that it was built during the reign of Nyuserre is based on its location at Abusir, which was abandoned as a royal necropolis after Nyuserre's death. It was likely built for members of the extended royal family. The presence of a fragmentary alabaster statue of a woman as well as of the remains of the mummy of a woman suggest that the monuments served to bury two women. The double nature of the tomb strongly indicates a particular closeness of the individuals buried.

== See also ==
- List of Egyptian pyramids

== Bibliography ==
- Jaromír Krejčí: "Die »Zwillingspyramide« L 25 in Abusir." Sokar. No. 8, 2004, pp. 20–22.
- Dušan Magdolen: "Lepsius No. XXV: a problem of typology." Asian and African Studies. 2008, Vol. 17, No. 2, pp. 205–223. (Abstract).
- Miroslav Verner, Jaromír Krejčí: "Twin Pyramid Complex "Lepsius no. XXV" in Abusir." The World of Ancient Egypt. Essays in honor of Ahmed Abd el-Qader el-sawi. 2006, Supplément aux Annales du Service des Antiquités de l´Egypte 35. Supreme Council of Antiquities, Cairo, ISBN 977-437-015-5, S. 159–165.
