= Tisethor =

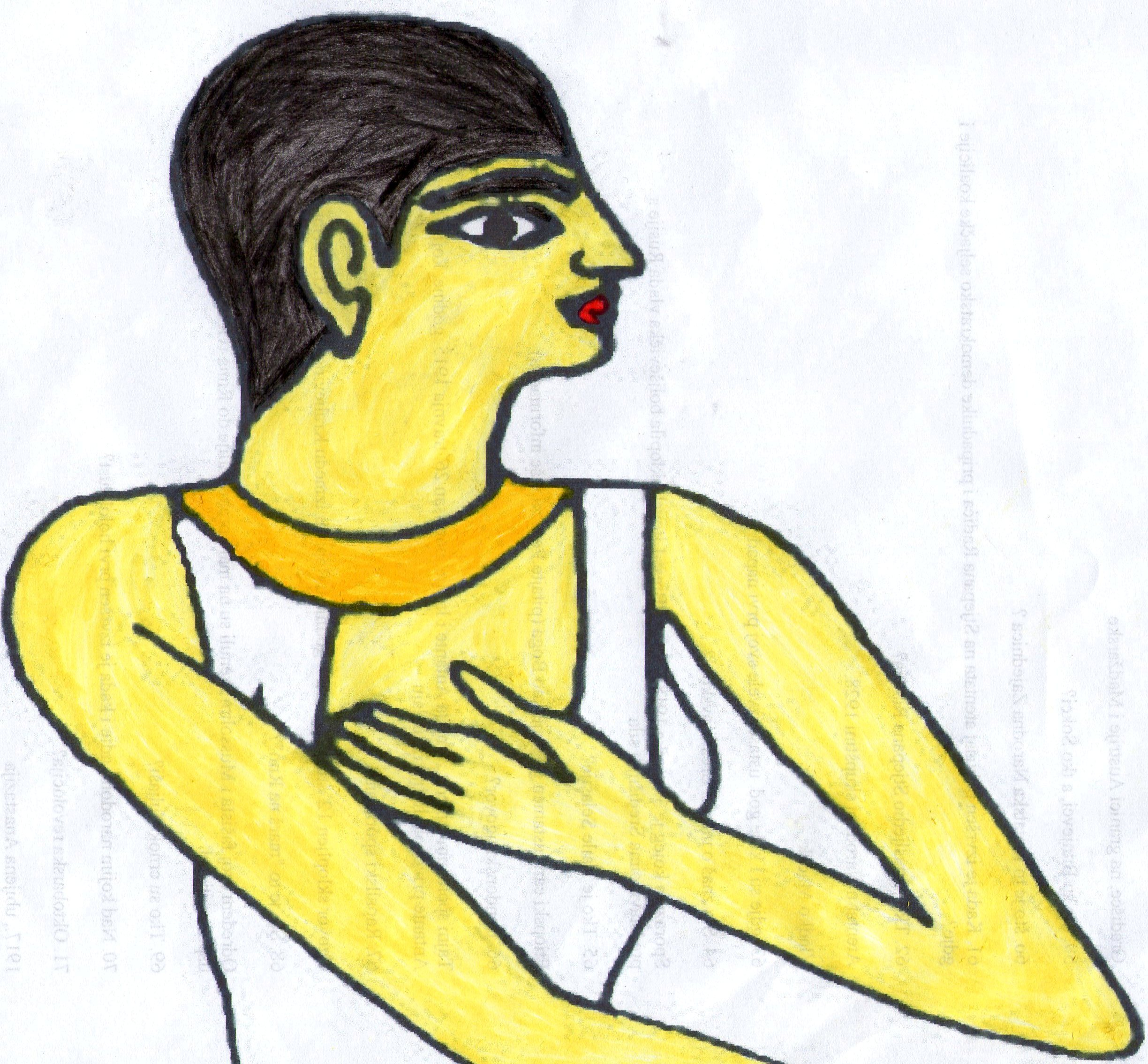

Tisethor ("Companion of Horus") was a princess of ancient Egypt. She may have been a daughter of Princess Kekheretnebti and granddaughter of the King Djedkare Isesi. Her father is not known. She was a niece of Neserkauhor, Meret-Isesi, and Isesi-ankh.

She barely reached the age of puberty when she died, and some estimates suggested she may have been 17-18 at the time of her death. She was buried in the mastaba of a woman who may have been her mother.
