= Lepsius XXIV =

Egyptian pyramid

Coordinates: 29°53′36.7″N 31°12′10.3″E

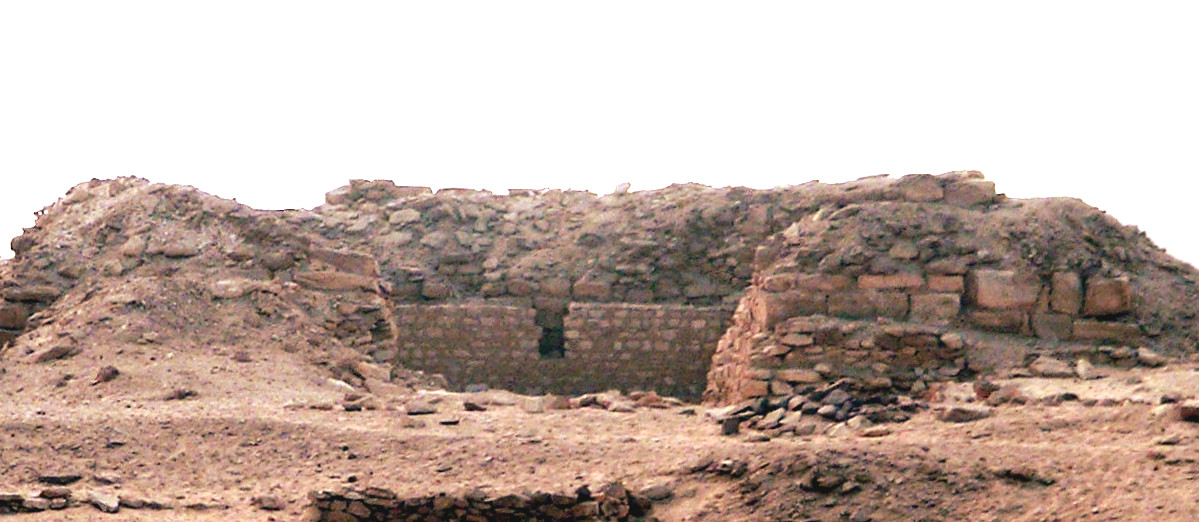
- Remains of Lepsius XXIV, 2011
- Interactive map of Lepsius XXIV
- Owner: Possibly Reptynub
- Constructed: c. 2430 BC
- Type: Pyramid
- Material: limestone, sand, rubble
- Height: 27.3 meters (original); 5 mmeters
- Base: 31.5 m
- Slope: 60°15′

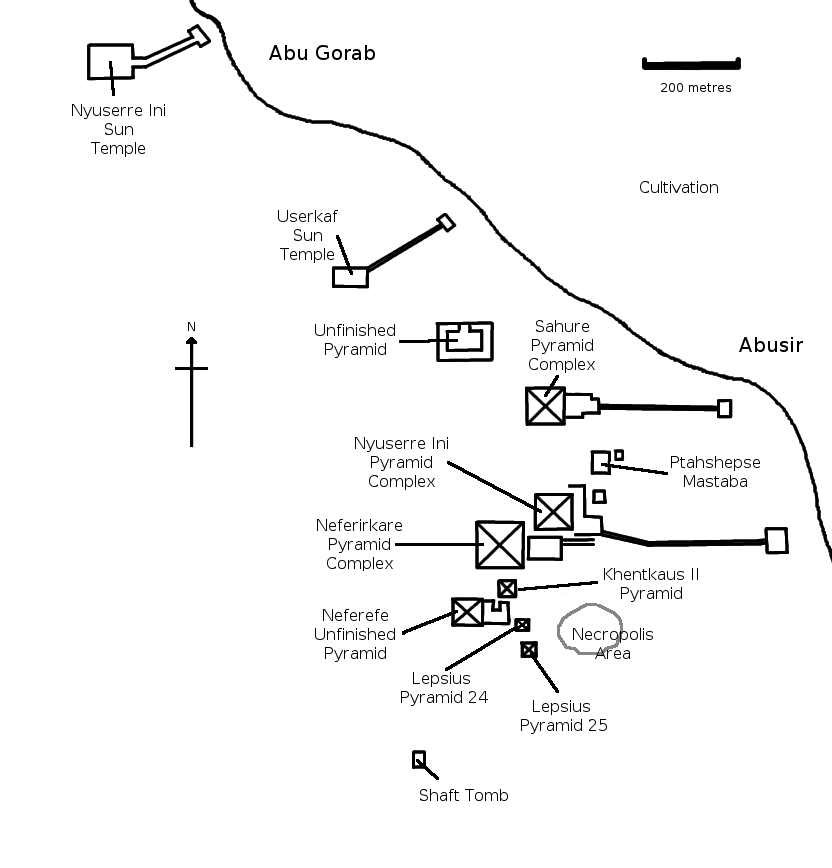
Location of Lepsius XXIV in the Abusir necropolis

The Lepsius XXIV Pyramid was an Egyptian pyramid, which was probably built for a wife of King Nyuserre Ini. The largely destroyed 5th Dynasty structure is located in the pyramid field of Abusir, east of the Pyramid of Neferefre and south of the Pyramid of Khentkaus II.

== Exploration ==
On his Prussian Expedition to Egypt, the German archaeologist Karl Richard Lepsius identified a small pyramid site and gave it the number XXIV (24) in his list of pyramids. Ludwig Borchardt, who explored the necropolis of Abusir six years later, considered the ruins to be a mastaba or double mastaba and did not investigate it further.

A Czech team led by Miroslav Verner undertook exploratory excavations from 1980-1981, 1987, and 1990, as well as a full excavation in 1994 and identified the complex as a pyramid with a cult pyramid and a mortuary temple, which they assigned to the time of the 5th dynasty King Nyuserre.

=== Identification ===
The inhabitant of the pyramid can not yet be identified, since no direct evidence, like inscriptions, remain. It is probable, however, that Nyuserre had the pyramid built for one of his wives, perhaps Reptynub.

== Pyramid ==
With a base measuring 31.5 m x 31.5 m and a slope of 60°15′, the Lepsius XXIV Pyramid originally had a height of 27.3 meters. The core structure of the pyramid was built in three layers, according to recent research. The masonry of the first layer consists of a stone casing, with the interior filled with sand, rubble and debris. A ramp structure oriented north–south and extending into the core structure was probably used for the erection of this layer. The second layer again consists of an outer stone casing with several partition walls at oblique angles, made up of irregularly shaped stone fragments. The space between was also filled with loose debris in the same way as the first layer. The third layer no longer exists. According to Verner, the mixed technique increased stability. A cladding of fine limestone appears to have been attached later, since the masonry of the mortuary temple touches the first core layer directly.

The masonry of the pyramid displays a large amount of construction graffiti. These graffiti regularly mention the Vizier Ptahshepses, who organised all royal construction under Nyuserre, which indicates that the pyramid was built during his reign.

== Substructure ==
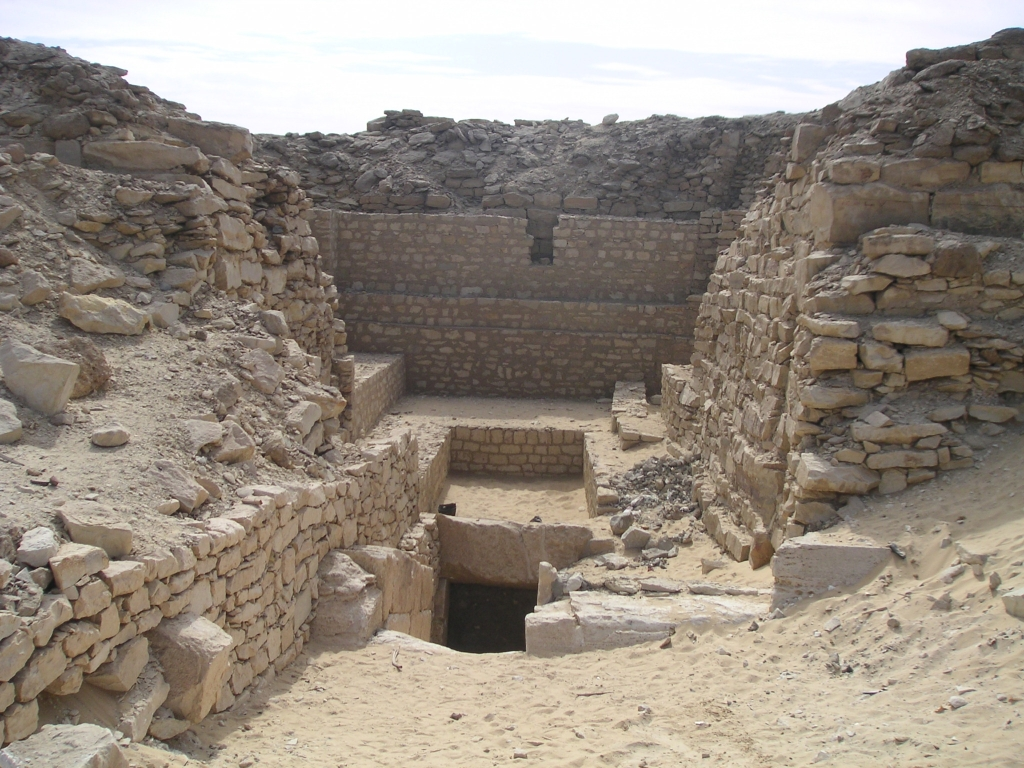
Entrance to the substructure of Lepsius XXIV

The substructure was laid out as an open grave, which was eventually covered over by the pyramid. The entranceway ran from the north and led to a burial chamber on an east–west orientation. The passageway has been largely been quarried away.

The burial chamber contained fragments of a pink granite sarcophagus, parts of the grave goods and the damaged mummy of a woman aged about 23, whose identity is unknown. She was probably the owner of the pyramid, but it is also possible that she is an intrusive burial from a later period, since the remains of the mummy show traces of the removal of the brains, a mummification practice which is only attested from the beginning of the Middle Kingdom. An accurate dating of the mummy by Radiocarbon dating is not yet available. The name of the tomb's occupant is not attested.

In addition, the area of the burial chamber contains fragments of grave goods, like alabaster vessels, copper tools for the opening of the mouth ceremony and canopic jars.

== Complex ==
In the pyramid complex ruins, a small cult pyramid and a funerary temple can be identified. The whole complex was surrounded by a wall.

=== Cult pyramid ===
In the south corner of the complex is a small cult pyramid with a base of about 10 x 10 metres, which has largely been destroyed by extensive spoliation. Only some fine limestone cladding from the northwest corner and the west side remain intact. The orientation of these structures differs a little from the north–south orientation of the main structure.

=== Mortuary temple ===
The mortuary temple is located in the usual position on the east side of the pyramid and seems to have had a simple structure. Except for a false door on the side facing the pyramid, it seems unlikely that the temple was decorated with reliefs, since no fragments of relief were found at all.

The structure was largely destroyed by spoliation in the New Kingdom and the Saite Period, especially on the south side, and as a result a reconstruction is no longer possible.

== See also ==
- List of Egyptian pyramids

== Bibliography ==
- Miroslav Verner: Die Pyramiden. Rowohlt, Hamburg 1998, ISBN 3-499-60890-1, pp. 355 ff.: Die Pyramide «Lepsius Nr. XXIV».
