= Pyramid of Khentkaus II =

Smooth-sided pyramid

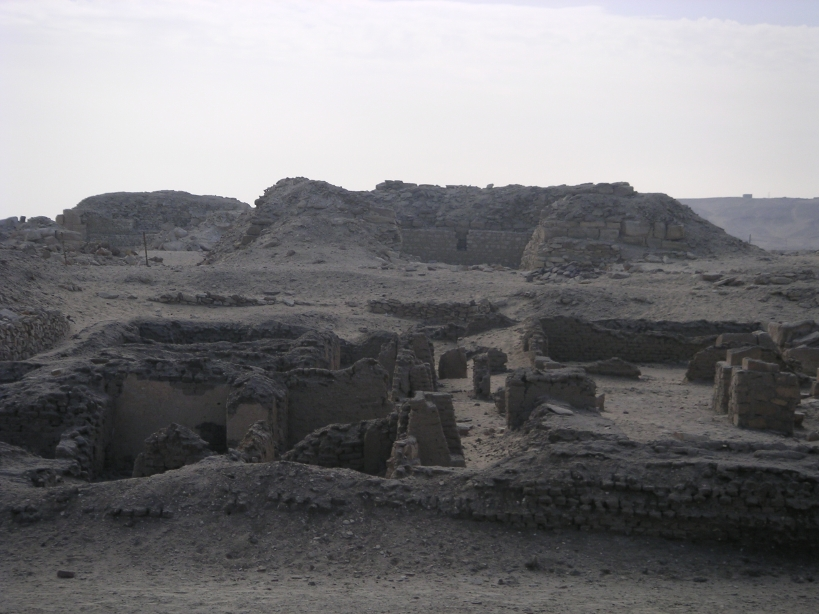
- Remains of the pyramid (foreground), 2007

Khentkaus II
- Constructed: c. 2460 BC
- Type: True pyramid
- Material: limestone with granite pyramidion
- Height: 17 meters (original); 4 meters
- Base: 25 x 25 meters
- Slope: 52°

The pyramid of Khentkaus II is a queen's pyramid in the necropolis of Abusir in Egypt, which was built during the Fifth dynasty of Ancient Egypt. It is attributed to the queen consort Khentkaus II, who may have ruled Egypt as a reigning queen after the death of her husband Neferirkare Kakai. The pyramid is now a heavily damaged ruin, which only stands 4 metres high.

== Discovery ==
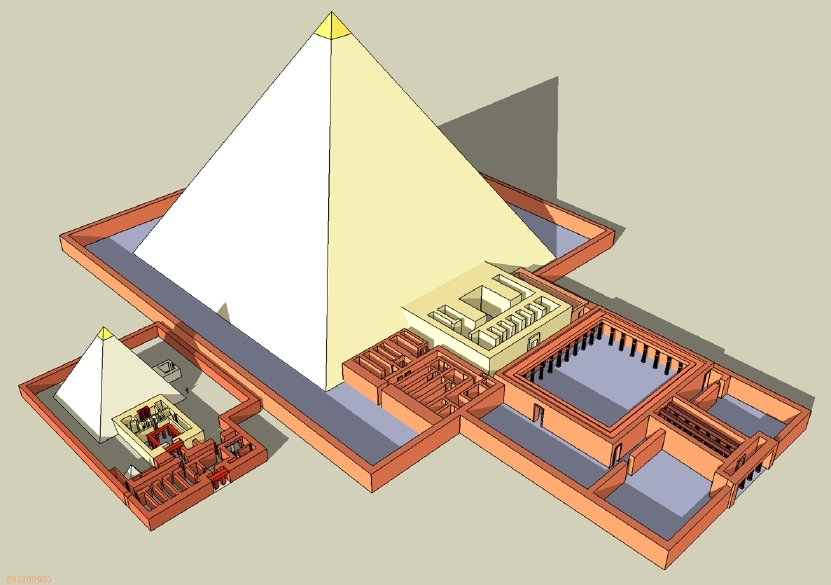
Location of the pyramid complex of Khentkaus II within the pyramid complex of Neferirkare

The area of the pyramid of Khentkaus II, directly south of the pyramid complex of Neferirkare was first explored at the beginning of the 20th century by Ludwig Borchardt, who also found remains of the complex, which he incorrectly identified as a double mastaba after carrying out some soundings.

Excited by the discovery of a papyrus fragment from the 5th dynasty, the Czech archaeologist Miroslav Verner investigated the previously unexplored area during the excavations which he undertook in Abousir with his team from 1975 to 1980. In the process he discovered that it was not a mastaba at all, but a small pyramid complex.

Through his excavations, Verner was able to clearly assign the structure to a queen named Khentkaus. It was not initially clear whether this was the same individual as Khentkaus I of the Fourth dynasty whose tomb is at Giza. Both Khentkaus I and Khentkaus II had an unusual title which indicated that they had ruled Egypt personally. From the archaeological context, however, it was possible to date the pyramid at Abousir to the 5th dynasty and to identify the owner of the pyramid with the wife of Neferirkare: Khentkaus II.

== Construction ==
Construction of the pyramid of Khentkaus II began in the reign of her husband Neferirkare and appears to have been originally planned as a simple queen's pyramid within the pyramid complex of Neferirkare. Inscriptions from this phase of the construction give the name of Khentkaus with the title "Royal Wife." Between the tenth and eleventh regnal year of the king there was a change in the building work, which had reached the height of the grave chamber roof by this point. The reason for the change was probably the death of the king.

Although the continuation of construction during the subsequent short reign of Neferefre cannot be ruled out, there is very little evidence for it.

Only under Nyuserre Ini does work seem to have resumed on the complex. On inscriptions from this time, Khentkaus' title is "Queen mother." In this period, the pyramid was completed, a temple was erected in two phases and the rest of the complex was built.

There is also an inscription from this time, which gives her title as Mw.t-nsw-bj.tj-nsw-bj.tj, which might be read as "Mother of the King of Upper and Lower Egypt and King of Upper and Lower Egypt" or as "Mother of two kings of Upper and Lower Egypt." The first interpretation would indicate that Khentkaus II had reigned as monarch in her own right for at least a short time - a possibility which is also supported by the depiction of her with the symbols of the king.

== Pyramid ==
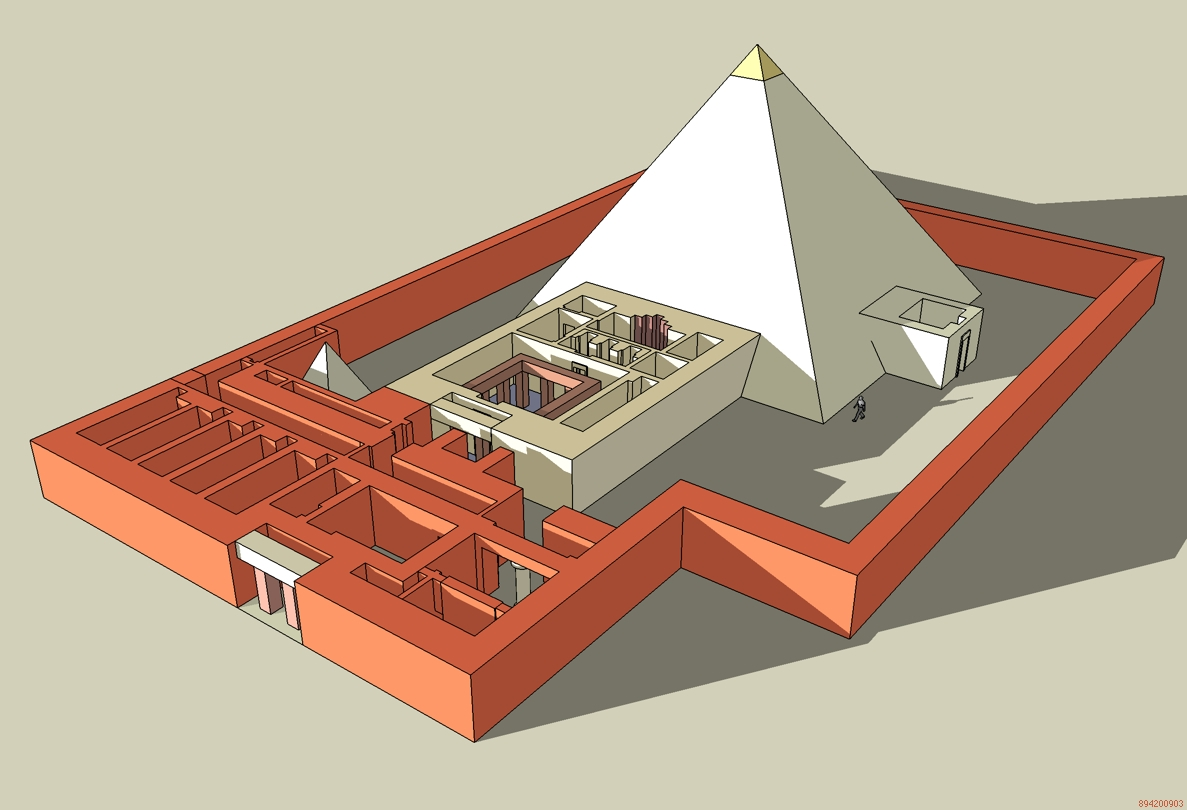
Reconstruction of the Pyramid

The pyramid had a base which measured 25 metres by 25 metres and, if its slope was the 52° angle which was usual for pyramids in the 5th dynasty, then it would have been about 17 metres tall. The core of the pyramid was formed by three stages of small limestone blocks, which were held together by clay morter. This material was the left over remains of the material used to build Neferirkare's pyramid. The core seems to have been covered with a fine Tura limestone cladding. The top of the pyramid was formed by a grey-black granite pyramidion, fragments of which were found in the ruins.

In the first phase of construction, under Neferirkare, the core structure of the pyramid was built, but the cladding and the mortuary temple were not added. The archaeological evidence suggests that the cladding was first added at the same time as the limestone mortuary temple was built, under Niuserre.

The pyramid structure has been heavily damaged by spoliation, such that the ruins are now only 4 metres high. The shoddy masonry work and poor quality material facilitated both destruction by quarrying and erosion.

=== Substructure ===
The substructure of the pyramid is a flat, open tomb which is very clearly preserved. From the north, a corridor descends for about half its length, then continues on the horizontal and turns slightly to the east. Shortly before the burial chamber there is a granite fall-trap. The grave chamber itself was oriented in an east–west direction. The building material for the passageway and the chamber was small blocks of fine limestone. The ceiling of the grave chamber was flat and formed from massive limestone blocks.

The chamber itself is heavily damaged, but fragments of a pink granite sarcophagus have been found. Some of the bindings from the mummy and fragments of alabaster grave goods were also found. These remains indicate that the pyramid was indeed used as the queen's final resting place.

== Pyramid complex ==
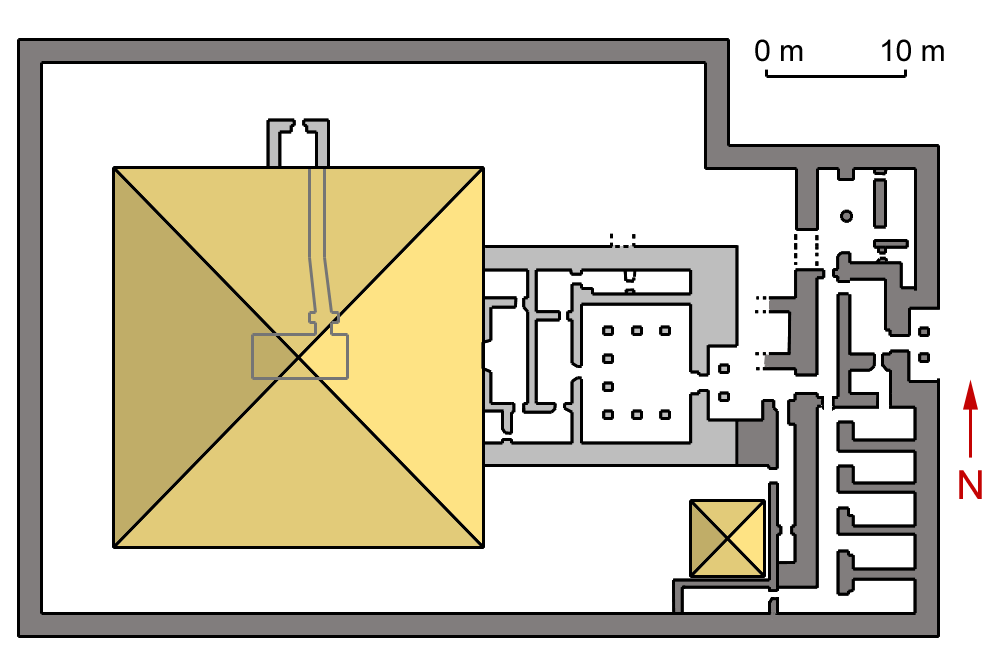
Plan of the pyramid and the temple Light grey: first building phase Dark grey: second building phase

The pyramid of Khenkaus II had its own independent pyramid complex and was not part of the pyramid complex of Khentkaus' husband Neferirkare. The complex contains all important elements necessary for the maintenance of a ruler cult. Thus far, a causeway and a valley temple have not been identified.

=== North chapel ===
At the centre of the north side of the pyramid, there is a small offering chapel, which probably contained an altar. This small structure is located slightly east of the entrance to the pyramid's substructure. There are only the smallest traces of the north chapel now remaining.

=== Cult pyramid ===
In the southeast corner, there was a small cult pyramid, which measured 5.2 x 5.2 metres at the base and had a height of about 4.5 metres - significantly steeper than the main pyramid, with an incline of around 60°. The cult pyramid was made from the same material as the outer wall of the complex and was built as part of a late expansion of the complex, along with the second phase of the construction of the mortuary temple. The cult pyramid has been almost entirely destroyed; only slight traces remain. No substructure has been detected so far.

=== Mortuary temple ===
The mortuary temple is on the east side of the pyramid and was constructed as part of the final phase of the complex's construction under Niuserre. The construction of the temple took place in two phases: first, a small temple was built of limestone, which was later enlarged with mud brick.

The original limestone temple was entered from the east through a columned portico. Inside, there was an open-roofed pillared court with eight columns, a statue hall which contained sixteen cult statues of the queen according to a papyrus fragment found in the temple archive, an offering hall with a pink granite false door, an altar and storage chambers. A stairway led to a roof terrace. The offering hall was decorated with images carved in relief and inscriptions. Other rooms may have been as well. The pillars in the courtyard had similar decoration. One of them had a depiction of the queen with the uraeus on her forehead - a royal symbol which has been interpreted as meaning that Khentkaus II had been a reigning queen. Other images show offering scenes, a meal for the dead, landscapes, processions, and family scenes.

In the expansion of the temple in the second phase, a new entrance way was added on the east side, as well as five more storage chambers, and a dwelling for priests. Mud brick was used for these new additions, rather than limestone masonry. In the course of the expansion, a mudbrick wall was built around the complex, separating it from the pyramid complex of Neferirkare.

The mortuary cult of Khentkaus II is still attested over three hundred years later at the end of the 6th dynasty.

=== Compound wall ===
The complex was surrounded by a massive mud brick wall, which is clearly distinct from the compound wall of the neighbouring pyramid complex of Neferirkare. Some remains of an earlier limestone wall from the first construction phase indicate that the complex was originally intended to be connected to her husband's pyramid complex. The complex was turned into an independent area during the expansion of the mortuary temple.

== Spoliation and destruction ==
The pyramid was first robbed in the First Intermediate Period. In the Middle Kingdom, the pyramid was reopened and the sarcophagus was reused for the burial of a child. The pyramid complex suffered major damage at the end of the New Kingdom as a result of spoliation. The material taken from the complex was reused in new building work.

== See also ==
- List of Egyptian pyramids

== Bibliography ==
- Miroslav Verner: Abusir. Realm of Osiris. American University in Cairo Press, Cairo. 2002, ISBN 977-424-723-X.
- Miroslav Verner: Die Pyramiden (= Rororo 60890 rororo-Sachbuch). Rowohlt-Taschenbuch-Verlag, Reinbek 1999, ISBN 3-499-60890-1, pp. 332–336.
- Miroslav Verner: Forgotten Pharaohs, lost Pyramids. Abúsír. Academia, Prague 1994, ISBN 80-200-0022-4.
- Miroslav Verner: "Further Thoughts on the Khentkaus Problem." In: Discussions in Egyptology. Vol. 38, 1997, ISSN 0268-3083, pp. 109–117 Online (PDF; 2,8 MB).
- Miroslav Verner: The Pyramid Complex of Khentkaus (= Abusir. Vol. 3). Reprinted edition. Universitas Carolina Pragensis, Prague 2001, ISBN 80-200-0874-8.
- Bretislav Vachala: Guide des sites d'Abousir (= Institut Français d'Archéologie Orientale. Bibliothèque générale. Vol. 24). Institut français d'archéologie orientale du Caire (IFAO), Kairo 2002, ISBN 2-7247-0326-X.
