= List of ancient Egyptian royal consorts =

This is a list of known royal consorts of ancient Egypt from c. 3100 BC to 30 BC. Reign dates follow those included on the list of pharaohs page. Some information is debatable and interpretations of available evidence can vary between Egyptologists.

== Background ==
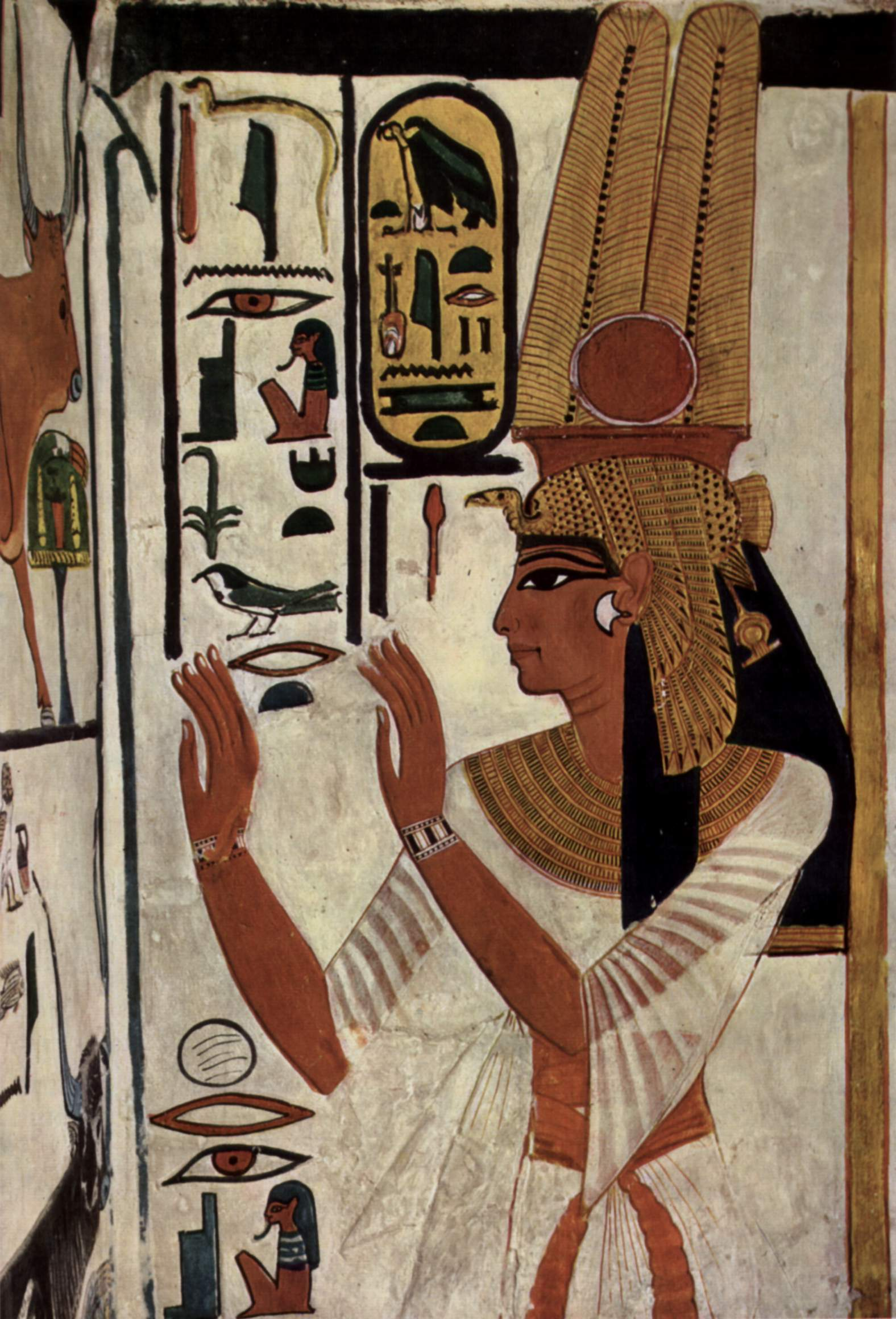
Nefertari, wife of Ramesses II

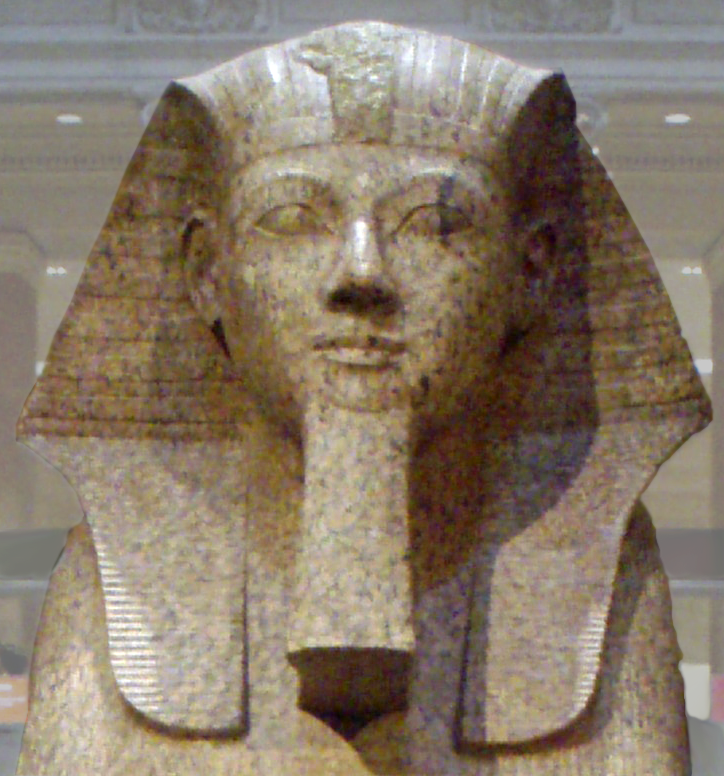
Hatshepsut, wife of Thutmose II and later Pharaoh in her own right

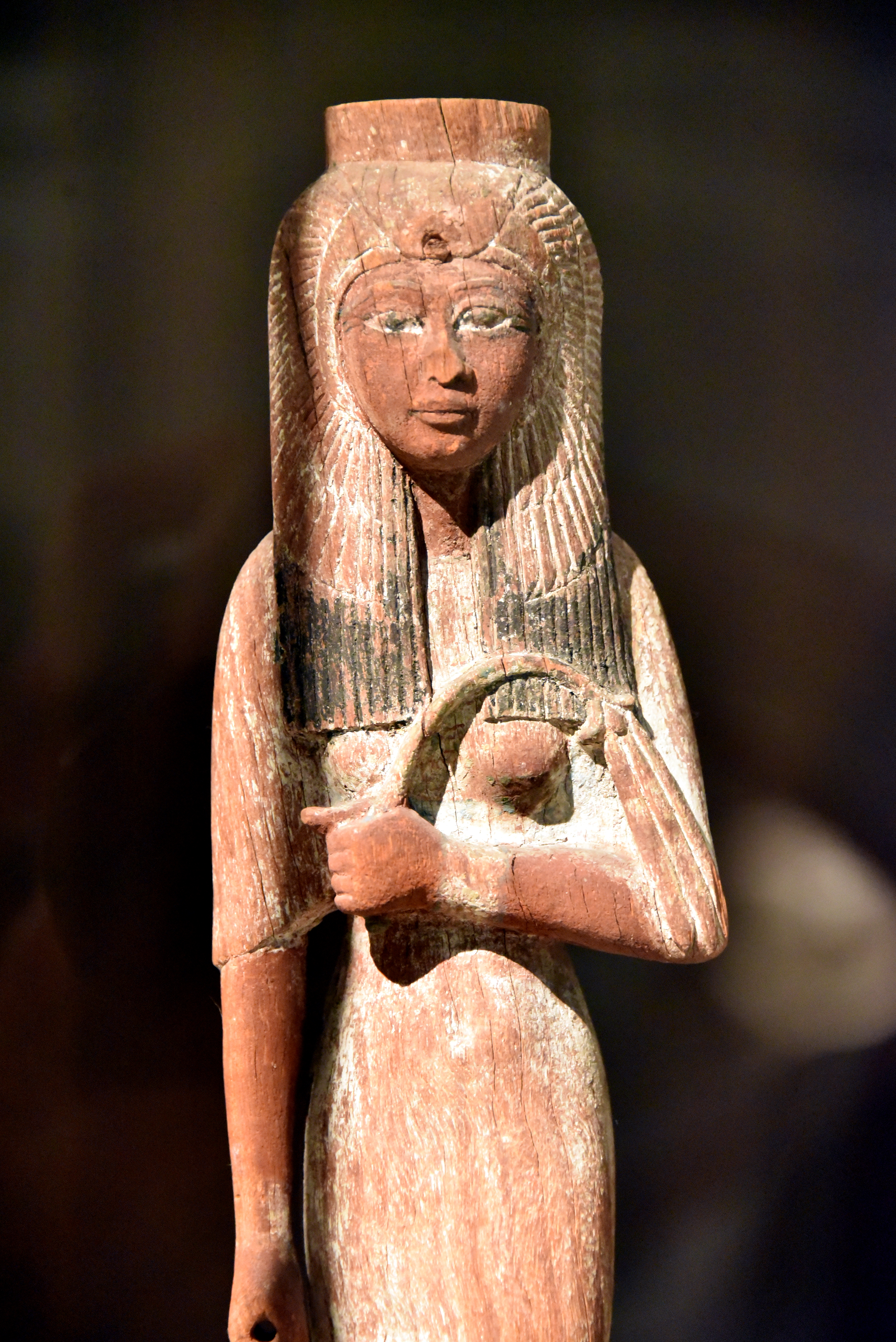
Ahmose–Nefertari, wife of Ahmose

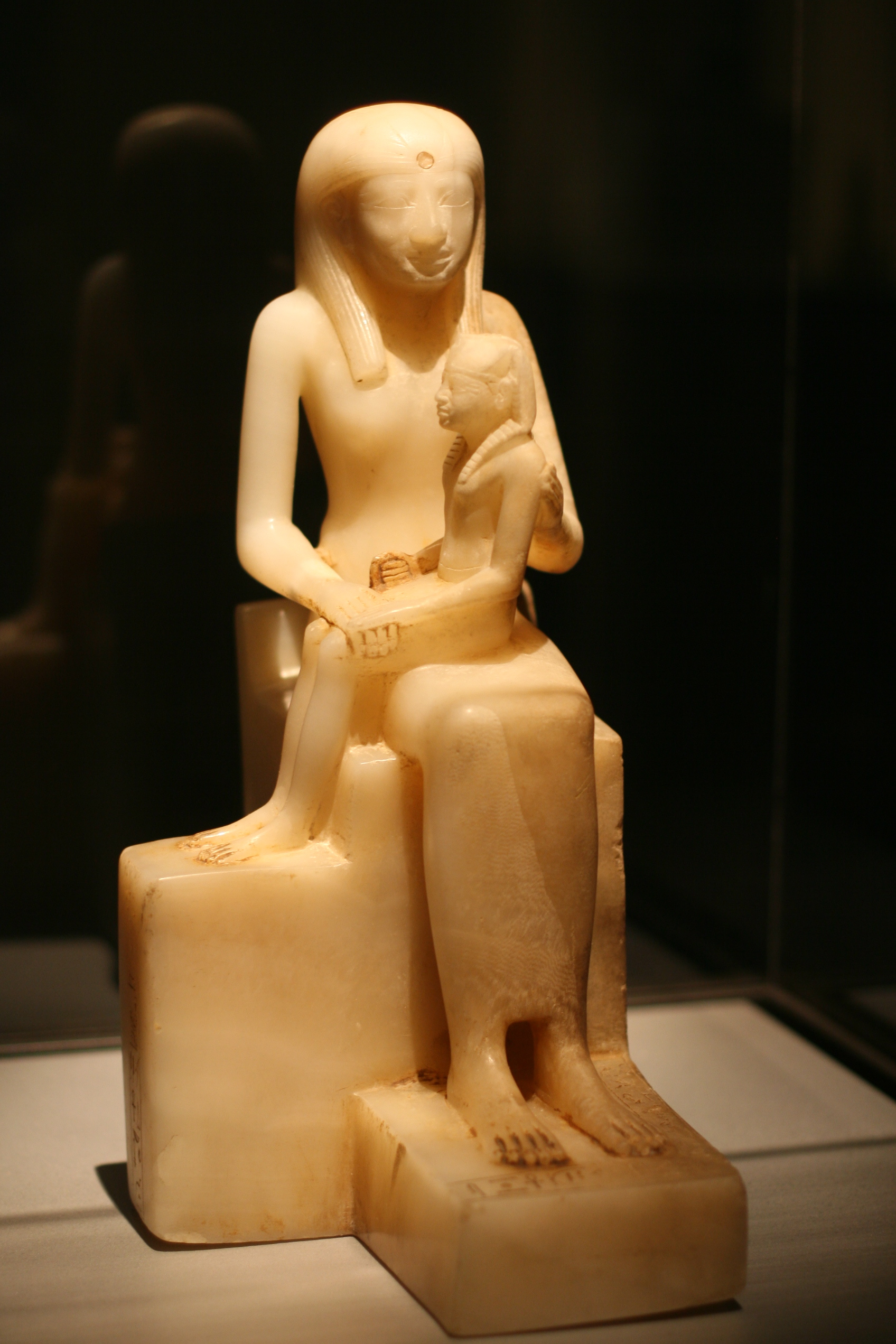
Ankhesenpepi II with her son Pepi II Neferkare

The Pharaoh's wives played an important role both in public and private life, and would be a source of political and religious power. Pharaohs usually had many different wives, so that a successor could be guaranteed to succeed him. If a queen succeeded in producing an heir that inherited the throne, she would reach a position of great honour as King's Mother and may be able to rule Egypt on behalf of her son as regent if he was underage. While there are many known cases of kings marrying their sisters, there were also wives of non–royal birth, such as Tiye and Nefertiti. Kings such as Amenhotep III and Ramesses II are known to have married some of their daughters, though it is possible these marriages were symbolic and ceremonial rather than incestuous. Apart from the chief consort, the Pharaoh would have many wives in the harem, who could be foreign–born princesses or lower–ranking Egyptian women who had little impact on politics.

While women did occasionally rule as Pharaohs, they generally did not rule while married except during the Ptolemaic period. Thus, male consorts never existed during the time of the native Egyptian royal dynasties, and only Berenice IV and Cleopatra VII are listed as having male consorts who did not rule as Pharaohs.

=== List of female rulers and co–rulers ===
Most Queens included on this page did not rule as Pharaohs. However, some did rule in their own right following the deaths of their husbands. Four Queens from the Native Egyptian dynasties are known for certain to have ruled as Female Pharaohs:

1. Sobekneferu (c. 1806–1802 BC), Possibly wife of Amenemhat IV
2. Hatshepsut (c. 1479–1458 BC), Wife of Thutmose II and co-pharaoh with Thutmose III
3. Neferneferuaten (c. 1334–1332 BC), Wife of either Akhenaten or Smenkhkare depending on her identity
4. Tausret (c. 1191–1189 BC), Wife of Seti II

There has also been some debate on whether certain Queen regents such as Neithhotep, Merneith, Khentkaus I and Khentkaus II did rule as Female Pharaohs or not. However, there is yet to be any concrete evidence that they did. The legendary Queen Nitocris was supposedly a Pharaoh at the end of the Sixth Dynasty, but no archeological evidence supports her existence.

The Ptolemaic dynasty implemented a policy of co–rule between spouses. Therefore, many Queens from this dynasty are not listed as consorts as they were co–rulers of Egypt while married to their husbands.

Women who were dating their regnal years in royal protocols (alongside their co–rulers or independently) and thus were unquestionable Pharaohs were:

1. Cleopatra II (170–164, 163–127, 124–116 BC), initially Queen consort, then Queen regnant alongside her brother–husband Ptolemy VI Philometor, her younger brother (later husband) Ptolemy VIII Physcon, her son Ptolemy VII Neos Philopator, her daughter Cleopatra III and briefly her grandson Ptolemy IX Soter. She was the sole ruler of Egypt from 131 to 127 BC, the first woman to do so since Tausret over a millennium before. She was also first known Ptolemaic queen included in dating protocols as ruler alongside her spouses, making her unquestionably queen in her own right.
2. Cleopatra III (142–131, 127–101 BC), ruled alongside her uncle–husband Ptolemy VIII Physcon, her mother Cleopatra II, her eldest son Ptolemy IX Soter, her daughter Cleopatra IV and her second eldest son Ptolemy X Alexander I.
3. Berenice III (101–88, 81–80 BC), ruled alongside her uncle–husband Ptolemy X Alexander I, her father Ptolemy IX Soter and her brother–husband Ptolemy XI Alexander II. She briefly ruled by herself from 81 BC to 80 BC before she was murdered on the orders of Ptolemy XI Alexander II.
4. Cleopatra V (79–68 BC), ruled alongside her husband Ptolemy XII Auletes.
5. Cleopatra VI (58–57 BC), ruled alongside her sister Berenice IV. However, some historians theorise she may actually be the same person as Cleopatra V.
6. Berenice IV (58–55 BC), briefly ruled alongside her sister (or possibly mother) Cleopatra VI, but otherwise spent most of her reign as the sole ruler of Egypt.
7. Cleopatra VII (51–30 BC), ruled alongside her brother–husband Ptolemy XIII Theos Philopator, her second brother–husband Ptolemy XIV Philopator and her son Caesarion.

Evidence of co–rulership in early dynasty is ambiguous. List of Ptolemaic queens who could be co–rulers with their husband includes:

1. Arsinoe II (c. 277–270 BC), possibly ruled alongside her brother–husband Ptolemy II Philadelphus. She is considered Pharaoh by Sally Ann Ashton.
2. Berenice II (c. 244–222 BC), possibly (Note: Berenice did have titles of "female Horus" and "female Pharaoh", but was not included in dating protocols as co-ruler to her husband. However she is considered Pharaoh by Sally Ann Ashton.) ruled alongside her husband Ptolemy III Euergetes.
3. Arsinoe III (220–204 BC), possibly (Note: Arsinoe III did have title of "ruler", but was not included in dating protocols as co-ruler to her husband, making her status ambiguous. Tara Sewell-Lasater classifies her as queen-consort. However Arsinoe is considered Pharaoh by Sally Ann Ashton.) ruled alongside her brother–husband Ptolemy IV Philopator.
4. Cleopatra I Syra (193–176 BC), possibly (Note: While Cleopatra did have titles like "female Horus" and "female Pharaoh", she was not included in dating protocols as co-Pharaoh during her husband's reign. However she is considered Pharaoh by Sally Ann Ashton.) ruled alongside her husband Ptolemy V Epiphanes and as a regent (Note: She was included in dating protocols as senior monarch during her son's minority and is ambiguously described as "regent and co-ruler".) on behalf of her son Ptolemy VI Philometor.

The claimant queen of Egypt Arsinoe IV (48–47 BC) declared herself Pharaoh in opposition to her sister Cleopatra VII.

=== List of regents ===
Occasionally when the new Pharaoh was too young to rule, his mother or step–mother would rule temporarily as a regent on his behalf. Because they did not hold the title of 'King' during their time in power, they are generally not included on Lists of Pharaohs. The following Queens are likely to have ruled as regents:

1. Neithhotep possibly ruled on behalf of her son Hor–Aha (c. 3050 BC)
2. Merneith ruled on behalf of her son Den (c. 2970 BC)
3. Nimaathap possibly ruled on behalf of her son Djoser (c. 2670 BC)
4. Khentkaus I likely ruled as a regent, but her son or sons are unknown.
5. Khentkaus II possibly ruled as a regent for one of her sons (Neferefre or Nyuserre Ini).
6. Iput possibly ruled as a regent for her son Pepi I Meryre (c. 2332 BC)
7. Ankhesenpepi II ruled as a regent for her son Pepi II Neferkare (c. 2278 BC)
8. Ahhotep I ruled as a regent for her son Ahmose I (c. 1550 BC)
9. Ahmose–Nefertari ruled as a regent for her son Amenhotep I (c. 1541 BC)
10. Hatshepsut initially ruled as a regent for her step–son Thutmose III (c. 1479 BC) before becoming Pharaoh and co–ruler.
11. Mutemwiya may have ruled as a regent for her son Amenhotep III (c. 1388 BC)
12. Tausret ruled as a regent for Siptah who could be her step–son (c. 1197 BC)

== Predynastic Period ==
=== Dynasty "Zero" (Before c. 3100 BC) ===
Picture	Name	Spouse	Father	Mother	Sons	Daughters	Burial Place	Notes
	Ka–Neith	–	–	–	–	–	–	An inscription of the queen's name was found at el–Beda.
	Ha	Ka	–	–	–	–	–	–

== Early Dynastic Period ==
=== First Dynasty (c. 3100–2890 BC) ===
Picture	Name	Spouse	Father	Mother	Sons	Daughters	Burial Place	Notes
	Neithhotep	Narmer	Local Naqada Royalty(?)		Hor–Aha	–	Tomb of Neithhotep, Naqada	Possibly ruled as regent for her son Hor–Aha.
	Benerib	Hor–Aha	–	–	–	–	Umm El Qa'ab Tomb B14	–
	Khenthap	Hor–Aha	–	–	Djer	–	–	Only known from the Palermo Stone, no known contemporary sources mention her.
	Herneith	Djer	–	–	Djet (?)	–	Saqqara Tomb S3507(?)	–
	Nakhtneith	Djer	–	–	–	–	Umm El Qa'ab Tomb O Complex	–
	Penebui	Djer	–	–	–	–	–	May have died due to decapitation but this is disputed.
	Merneith	Djet	Djer(?)	–	Den	–	Umm El Qa'ab Tomb Y	Ruled as Regent for her son Den.
	Seshemetka	Den(?)	–	–	–	–	–	May have been a wife of Djer.
	Semat	Den(?)	–	–	–	–	–	–
	Serethor	Den(?)	–	–	–	–	–	–
	Betrest	Anedjib(?)	–	–	Semerkhet	–	–	May have been a wife of Den.

=== Second Dynasty (c. 2890–2686 BC) ===
Picture	Name	Spouse	Father	Mother	Sons	Daughters	Burial Place	Notes
	Menka	Unknown, Khasekhemwy (?)	–	–	–	–	–	Attested by a basalt relief fragment similar in appearance to one attributed to Khasekhemwy. However, a recent review of the evidence make it likely that Menka was not a queen.
	Nimaathap	Khasekhemwy	–	–	Djoser; Sekhemkhet (?); Sanakht (?)	–	Beit Khallaf (Tomb K1) (?)	May have ruled as regent for her son Djoser.

== Old Kingdom ==
=== Third Dynasty (c. 2686–2613 BC) ===
Picture	Name	Spouse	Father	Mother	Sons	Daughters	Burial Place	Notes
	Hetephernebti	Djoser	Khasekhemwy (?)	–	–	Inetkaes	Saqqara (?)	–
	Djeseretnebti	Sekhemkhet (?)	–	–	–	–	–	Her status as queen is a matter of debate due to lack of royal titles found beside the name.
	Djefatnebti	Huni (?)	–	–	–	–	–	–
	Meresankh I	Huni (?)	–	–	Sneferu	Hetepheres I (?)	–	–

=== Fourth Dynasty (c. 2613–2494 BC) ===
Picture	Name	Spouse	Father	Mother	Sons	Daughters	Burial Place	Notes
	Hetepheres I	Sneferu	Huni	Meresankh I (?)	Khufu	–	Tomb G 7000X, Giza	–
	Meritites I	Khufu	Sneferu	–	Kawab; Djedefre (?)	Hetepheres II	Pyramid G1–b	–
	Henutsen	Khufu	Sneferu (?)	–	Khafre (?), Khufukhaf I, Minkhaf I	–	Pyramid G1–c	–
	Khentetka	Djedefre	–	–	–	–	–	–
	Meresankh II	1) Prince Horbaef 2) Djedefre or Khafre	Khufu (?)	Meritites I (?)	With Horbaef: Djaty; Nebty–tepites	With Horbaef: Nefertkau III	–	–
	Hetepheres II	1) Prince Kawab 2) Djedefre 3) Khafre (?)	Khufu	Meritites I	With Kawab: Duaenhor; Kaemsekhem; Mindjedef	With Kawab: Meresankh III With Djedefre: Neferhetepes	Giza Tomb G7530–7540	–
	Meresankh III	Khafre	Kawab	Hetepheres II	Nebemakhet; Duaenre; Niuserre; Khenterka	Shepsetkau	Giza Tomb G7530–7540	–
	Khamerernebty I	Khafre	Khufu (?)	–	Menkaure	Khamerernebty II	–	–
	Persenet	Khafre	Khufu (?)	–	Nikaure	–	Giza Tomb LG88	–
	Hekenuhedjet	Khafre	–	–	Sekhemkare	–	–	–
	Khamerernebty II	Menkaure	Khafre	Khamerernebty I	Khuenre	–	Giza Tomb G3a or Tomb G3b (?)	–
	Rekhetre	Menkaure (?)	Khafre	–	–	–	Giza Tomb G8530	–
	Bunefer	Shepseskaf (?)	–	–	–	–	Giza Tomb G8408	Unclear whether she was a wife or daughter of Shepseskaf

=== Fifth Dynasty (c. 2494–2345 BC) ===
Picture	Name	Spouse	Father	Mother	Sons	Daughters	Burial Place	Notes
	Khentkaus I	Userkaf (?)	Menkaure (?)	–	Previously believed to have been mother of Sahure and Neferirkare Kakai, but newer evidence contradicts this theory.	–	Pyramid of Khentkaus I	There has been much debate around this queen's identity. She may have ruled as regent for one or more of her sons. Alternatively, her titles suggest that she may have ruled as Pharaoh in her own right, but this is disputed. She may have been in fact a wife of Shepseskaf or the ephemeral Thamphthis rather than Userkaf. She may even be the same person as Thamphthis but this is not a widely accepted theory.
	Neferhetepes	Userkaf	–	–	Sahure	Meretnebty(?)	Pyramid complex of Queen Neferhetepes	–
	Meretnebty	Sahure	Userkaf	Neferhetepes (?)	Neferirkare Kakai; Horemsaf (?); Netjerirenre (?); Khakare (?); Nebankhre (?), Shepseskare (?)	–	–	Known in older studies as Neferethanebty
	Khentkaus II	Neferirkare Kakai	–	–	Neferefre; Nyuserre Ini	–	Pyramid of Khentkaus II	May have ruled as regent or as Pharaoh in her own right.
	Khentkaus III	Neferefre	Neferirkare Kakai	Khentkaus II	Menkauhor Kaiu or Shepseskare(?)	–	Giza Tomb AC 30	–
	Reptynub	Nyuserre Ini	–	–	Reputnebty (?); Khentykauhor (?)	Khamerernebty	–	–
	Khuit I	Menkauhor Kaiu (?)	–	–	–	–	Saqqara Mastaba D 14	–
	Meresankh IV	Menkauhor Kaiu (?)	–	–	Raemka (?); Kaemtjenent (?); Isesi–ankh (?)	–	Saqqara Tomb 82	May have been a wife of Djedkare Isesi
	Setibhor	Djedkare Isesi	–	–	–	–	Pyramid of Setibhor	–
	Nebet	Unas	–	–	Unas–ankh (?)	Khentkaues (?); Neferut (?); Nefertkaues (?)	Double Mastaba north–east of Pyramid of Unas	–
	Khenut	Unas	–	–	–	Iput (I) (?)	Double Mastaba north–east of Pyramid of Unas	–
	Nebunebty	Unknown	–	–	–	–	Mastaba D18, Saqqara	Possibly married to either Neferirkare Kakai, Neferefre, Shepseskare or Nyuserre Ini.
	Nimaathap II	Unknown	–	–	–	–	Mastaba in Giza	–

=== Sixth Dynasty (c. 2345–2181 BC) ===
Picture	Name	Spouse	Father	Mother	Sons	Daughters	Burial Place	Notes
	Iput (I)	Teti	Unas	Nebet or Khenut (?)	Pepi I Meryre	–	Pyramid of Iput I	Possibly ruled as regent for her son Pepi I.
	Khuit II	Teti	–	–	Tetiankhkem	–	Pyramid of Khuit	–
	Khentkaus IV	Teti	–	–	Userkare (?)	–	–	–
	Naert	Teti	–	–	–	–	Tomb of Queen Naert	Funerary temple discovered in 2021.
	Ankhesenpepi I	Pepi I Meryre	Khui of Abydos	Nebet	Merenre Nemtyemsaf I	Neith	Saqqara	–
	Ankhesenpepi II	1) Pepi I Meryre 2) Merenre Nemtyemsaf I	Khui of Abydos	Nebet	With Merenre I: Pepi II Neferkare	–	Pyramid Complex of Pepi I	Ruled as regent for her son Pepi II Neferkare.
	Nubwenet	Pepi I Meryre	–	–	–	–	Pyramid Complex of Pepi I	–
	Inenek–Inti	Pepi I Meryre	–	–	–	–	Pyramid Complex of Pepi I	–
	Mehaa	Pepi I Meryre	–	–	Hornetjerkhet	–	Pyramid Complex of Pepi I	–
	Nedjeftet	Pepi I Meryre	–	–	–	–	–	–
	'Weret–Yamtes'	Pepi I Meryre	–	–	–	–	–	The real name of this queen is unknown, 'Weret–Yamtes' is an alias meaning 'Great of Sceptre'. She is mentioned on inscriptions found in the tomb of an official named Weni, which state that she conspired against the king but was punished when her plans were discovered.
	Benehu	Pepi I Meryre or Pepi II Neferkare	–	–	–	–	Pyramid in South Saqqara	Burial discovered in 2010.
	Neith	Pepi II Neferkare	Pepi I Meryre	Ankhesenpepi I	Merenre Nemtyemsaf II	–	Pyramid Complex of Pepi II	–
	Iput II	Pepi II Neferkare	Pepi I Meryre	–	–	–	Pyramid Complex of Pepi II	–
	Meritites IV	Pepi II Neferkare	Pepi I Meryre				Pyramid Complex of Pepi I	Was originally thought to be a consort of Pepi I, but later excavations proved she was the daughter of Pepi I, and the wife of Neferkare (Pepi II)
	Udjebten	Pepi II Neferkare	–	–	–	–	Pyramid Complex of Pepi II	–
	Ankhesenpepi III	Pepi II Neferkare	Merenre Nemtyemsaf I	–	–	–	Pyramid Complex of Pepi I	–
	Ankhesenpepi IV	Pepi II Neferkare	–	–	Neferkare II	–	Mortuary chapel of Iput II	–
	Nitocris	Merenre Nemtyemsaf II (according to Legend)	Pepi II Neferkare (according to Legend)	Neith (according to Legend)	–	–	–	According to writings by Herodotus and Manetho, she was a queen who came to rule Egypt following the murder of her brother/husband and plotted a revenge against his murderers by building a special chamber that would flood with water from the Nile while they dined there, afterwards she committed suicide by running into a burning room. Egyptologists now however believe that she was likely fictional and that her name is a misreading of the male pharaoh Neitiqerty Siptah. No archeological evidence exists to support her historicity.

== First Intermediate Period ==
=== Seventh, Eighth, Ninth and Tenth Dynasties (c. 2181–2040 BC) ===
No known queens from these dynasties.

=== Early Eleventh Dynasty (c. 2130–2040 BC) ===
Picture	Name	Spouse	Father	Mother	Sons	Daughters	Burial Place	Notes
	Neferu I	Mentuhotep I	–	–	Intef I	–	–	–
	Neferukayet	Intef II	Intef I	–	Intef III	–	–	–
	Iah	Intef III	Intef II	–	Mentuhotep II	Neferu II	–	–
	Henite	Intef III	–	–	–	–	–	–

== Middle Kingdom ==
=== Eleventh Dynasty Continued (c. 2040–1991 BC) ===
Picture	Name	Spouse	Father	Mother	Sons	Daughters	Burial Place	Notes
	Tem	Mentuhotep II	–	–	Mentuhotep III	–	Tomb DBXI.15, within the Mortuary Temple of Mentuhotep II.	–
	Neferu II	Mentuhotep II	Intef III	Iah	–	–	Tomb TT319	–
	Ashayet	Mentuhotep II	–	–	–	–	Tomb DBXI.17, within the Mortuary Temple of Mentuhotep II.	–
	Henhenet	Mentuhotep II	–	–	–	–	Tomb DBXI.11, within the Mortuary Temple of Mentuhotep II.	Died in childbirth.
	Sadeh	Mentuhotep II	–	–	–	–	Tomb DBXI.7, within the Mortuary Temple of Mentuhotep II.	–
	Kawit	Mentuhotep II	–	–	–	–	Tomb DBXI.9, within the Mortuary Temple of Mentuhotep II.	–
	Kemsit	–	–	–	–	-	Tomb TT308, within the Mortuary Temple of Mentuhotep II.	–
	Imi	Mentuhotep III (?)	–	–	Mentuhotep IV	–	–	–

=== Twelfth Dynasty (c. 1991–1802 BC) ===
Picture	Name	Spouse	Father	Mother	Sons	Daughters	Burial Place	Notes
	Neferitatjenen	Amenemhat I	–	–	Senusret I	Neferu III; Neferusherit (?); Kayet (?)	Pyramid Complex of Amenemhat I (?)	–
	Neferu III	Senusret I	Amenemhat I	Neferitatjenen	Amenemhat II	–	Pyramid Complex of Senusret I or possibly in Dahshur	–
	Keminub	Amenemhat II (?)	–	–	–	–	Funerary enclosure of Amenemhat II	Previously believed to have been a wife of Amenemhet II, but evidence suggests that she may actually be a queen of the 13th Dynasty whose husband is unknown.
	Kaneferu	Amenemhat II (?)	–	–	–	–	–	–
	Senet	Amenemhat II (?)	–	–	–	–	–	–
	Khenemetneferhedjet I	Senusret II	Amenemhat II	–	Senusret III	–	Mortuary Complex of Senusret II	–
	Nofret II	Senusret II	Amenemhat II	–	–	–	Mortuary Complex of Senusret II	–
	Itaweret	Senusret II	Amenemhat II	–	–	–	Funerary enclosure of Amenemhat II	–
	Khenmet	Senusret II	Amenemhat II	–	–	–	Funerary enclosure of Amenemhat II	–
	Sithathoriunet	Senusret III	Senusret II	–	Amenemhat III (?)	–	Pyramid Complex of Senusret II	–
	Khenemetneferhedjet II	Senusret III	–	–	–	–	Pyramid IX in the Dahshur Funerary Complex	–
	Neferthenut	Senusret III	–	–	–	–	Tomb II in the Pyramid Complex of Senusret III	–
	Meretseger	Senusret III	–	–	–	–	–	Due to lack of contemporary sources relating to her, it is thought she may not have existed but was rather a creation of the New Kingdom.
	Aat	Amenemhat III	–	–	–	–	Dahshur Funerary Complex	–
	Khenemetneferhedjet III	Amenemhat III	–	–	–	–	Dahshur Funerary Complex	–
	Hetepti	Amenemhat III (?)	–	–	Amenemhat IV	–	–	Unknown if she was actually a wife of Amenemhat III, as she is not known to have held the title of "King's Wife".
	Sobekneferu	Amenemhat IV (according to Manetho)	Amenemhat III	–	–	–	Northern Mazghuna pyramid (?)	First known woman to rule as Pharaoh in her own right (c. 1806–1802 BC) for which there is archeological evidence. It is however unknown for certain if Amenemhat IV was her husband or if she was ever married to a reigning Pharaoh at all prior to her own rule.

== Second Intermediate Period ==
=== Thirteenth Dynasty (c. 1802–1649 BC) ===
Picture	Name	Spouse	Father	Mother	Sons	Daughters	Burial Place	Notes
	Nofret (III)	Ameny Qemau (?)	–	–	–	Hatshepsut	–	This queen is only known from one stele which states that she was a "king's wife" and was the mother of "king's daughter" Hatshepsut. However, it is unknown which king she was married to. In 2017, a pyramid was discovered containing a canopic box naming "king's daughter" Hatshepsut and a stone slab with the name of king Ameny Qemau. It is however unknown if these two king's daughters are one and the same.
	Nubhetepti	Hor (?)	–	–	–	–	–	She held the title of "King's Mother", but it is unknown which king she was the mother of.
	Seneb[henas] I	Khendjer (?)	–	–	–	–	–	–
	Senebhenas II	Sobekhotep III	–	–	–	–	–	–
	Neni	Sobekhotep III	–	–	–	Iuhetibu Fendy; Dedetanqet (or Dedetanuq).	–	–
	Senebsen	Neferhotep I	–	–	–	–	–	–
	Tjan	Sobekhotep IV	–	–	Amenhotep	Nebetiunet	–	–
	Nubhotepti	Khahotepre Sobekhotep VI (?)	–	–	–	–	–	–
	Ineni	Merneferre Ay (?)	–	–	–	–	–	One of the first queens to have her name written in a cartouche.
	Nubkhaes (I)	Unknown	–	–	–	–	–	Either a wife of Merhotepre Sobekhotep, Khahotepre Sobekhotep VI or Wahibre Ibiau.
	Aya	Unknown	–	–	–	–	–	Either a wife of Sehetepkare Intef, Imyremeshaw or Khaankhre Sobekhotep.
	Abetni	Unknown	–	–	–	–	–	Married to an unknown king.
	Ahhotepi	Unknown	–	–	–	–	–	Possibly married to a king who reigned between Hor and Khendjer.
	Wadjet	Unknown	–	–	–	–	–	Possibly married to a king who reigned between Hor and Khendjer.
	Ankhmari	Unknown	–	–	–	–	–	Possibly married to a king who reigned after Merneferre Ay.
	Nehyt	Unknown	–	–	–	–	–	Possibly married to a king who reigned after Merneferre Ay.
	Nubhetepi II	Unknown	–	–	–	–	–	Possibly married to a king who reigned after Merneferre Ay.
	Resunefer	Unknown	–	–	–	–	–	Possibly married to a king who reigned after Merneferre Ay.
	Sithathor	Unknown	–	–	–	–	–	Possibly married to a king who reigned after Merneferre Ay.
	Sitsobk	Unknown	–	–	–	–	–	Possibly married to a king who reigned after Merneferre Ay.
-	Ameny	Unknown		–	–	–	–	–

=== Fourteenth Dynasty (c. 1725–1650 BC) ===
Picture	Name	Spouse	Father	Mother	Sons	Daughters	Burial Place	Notes
	Tati	Sheshi	Kushite Rulers of Kerma		Nehesy	–	–	Newer evidence suggests that Nehesy may not have actually been Tati's son.

=== Fifteenth Dynasty (Hyksos) (c. 1649–1550 BC) ===
Picture	Name	Spouse	Father	Mother	Sons	Daughters	Burial Place	Notes
	Tani	Apepi (?)	–	–	–	–	–	–

=== Sixteenth Dynasty (c. 1650–1582 BC) ===
Picture	Name	Spouse	Father	Mother	Sons	Daughters	Burial Place	Notes
	Mentuhotep	Sekhemre Sementawy Djehuty	Vizier Senebhenaf	Sobekhotep	–	–	Dra' Abu el-Naga	–
	Sitmut	Mentuhotep VI (?)	–	–	Herunefer	–	–	–

=== Seventeenth Dynasty (c. 1582–1550 BC) ===
Picture	Name	Spouse	Father	Mother	Sons	Daughters	Burial Place	Notes
	Nubemhat	Sobekemsaf I	–	–	–	Sobekemheb	–	–
	Nubkhaes (II)	Sobekemsaf II	–	–	–	–	–	Her burial was robbed in the late 20th Dynasty, along with that of her husband.
	Sobekemsaf	Nubkheperre Intef	–	–	–	Sobekemsaf	–	Sister of an unidentified pharaoh, possibly either Sekhemre–Heruhirmaat Intef, Sobekemsaf II or Senakhtenre Ahmose. Her mother is unknown, but was given a title of "King's daughter", suggesting that Sobekemsaf could have been a granddaughter of Sekhemre Wahkhau Rahotep.
	Haankhes	Unknown	–	–	Ameni	–	–	–
	Tetisheri	Senakhtenre Ahmose	Tjenna	Neferu	Seqenenre Tao; Kamose (?)	Ahhotep IAhmose Inhapy; Sitdjehuti	Possibly KV41	–
	Ahhotep I	Seqenenre Tao	Senakhtenre Ahmose	Tetisheri	Ahmose I Ahmose Sapair; Binpu	Ahmose–Nefertari; Ahmose–Henutemipet; Ahmose–Tumerisy, Ahmose–Nebetta; Ahmose–Meritamon (?)	–	Ruled as a regent for her son Ahmose I.
	Ahmose Inhapy	Seqenenre Tao	Senakhtenre Ahmose	Tetisheri	–	Ahmose–Henuttamehu	–	–
	Sitdjehuti	Seqenenre Tao	Senakhtenre Ahmose	Tetisheri	–	Ahmose	–	–
	Ahhotep II	Kamose	–	–	–	Ahmose–Sitkamose	–	–

== New Kingdom ==
=== Eighteenth Dynasty (c. 1550–1292 BC) ===
Picture	Name	Spouse	Father	Mother	Sons	Daughters	Burial Place	Notes
	Ahmose-Nefertari	Ahmose I	Seqenenre Tao	Ahhotep I	Ahmose-ankh; Amenhotep I Siamun; Ramose (?)	Ahmose-Meritamun; Ahmose–Sitamun; Mutnofret (?)	Dra' Abu el-Naga	Ruled as regent for her son Amenhotep I.
	Ahmose-Sitkamose	Ahmose I	Kamose	Ahhotep II	–	–	–	–
	Ahmose-Henuttamehu	Ahmose I	Seqenenre Tao	Ahmose Inhapy	–	–	–	–
	Ahmose-Meritamun	Amenhotep I	Ahmose I	Ahmose-Nefertari	–	–	Tomb TT358	–
	Sitkamose	Amenhotep I	–	–	–	–	–	–
	Ahmose	Thutmose I	–	–	–	Hatshepsut; Neferubity	Thebes	–
	Mutnofret	Thutmose I	Ahmose I	–	Thutmose II	–	–	–
	Hatshepsut	Thutmose II	Thutmose I	Ahmose	–	Neferure	KV20	Initially ruled as regent for her stepson Thutmose III before becoming a reigning Pharaoh herself (c. 1479–1458).
	Iset	Thutmose II	–	–	Thutmose III	–	–	–
	Satiah	Thutmose III	–	Ipu	Amenemhat (?)	–	–	Her father may have been Ahmose Pen–Nekhebet.
	Merytre-Hatshepsut	Thutmose III	–	Hui	Menkheperre, Amenhotep II	Nebetiunet; Meritamen; Iset; Meritamen (Note: Thutmose III and Hatshepsut-Meryetre had two daughters named Meritamen.)	Possibly KV35	–
	Nebtu	Thutmose III	–	–	–	–	–	–
	Menhet	Thutmose III	–	–	–	–	Wady Gabbanat el–Qurud	Foreign wife of Syrian descent.
	Menwi	Thutmose III	–	–	–	–	Wady Gabbanat el–Qurud	Foreign wife of Syrian descent.
	Merti	Thutmose III	–	–	–	–	Wady Gabbanat el–Qurud	Foreign wife of Syrian descent.
	Nebsemi	Thutmose III	–	–	–	–	–	–
	Tiaa	Amenhotep II	–	–	Thutmose IV	–	KV32	–
	Nefertari	Thutmose IV	–	–	–	–	–	–
	Iaret	Thutmose IV	Amenhotep II	–	–	–	–	–
	Mutemwiya	Thutmose IV	–	–	Amenhotep III	–	–	Ruled as regent for her son Amenhotep III.
	Daughter of Artatama I of Mitanni	Thutmose IV	Artatama I	–	–	–	–	Known from Amarna Letter EA 29.
	Tiye	Amenhotep III	Yuya	Thuya	Thutmose; Akhenaten	Sitamun; Iset; Henuttaneb; Nebetah; Beketaten	–	–
	Gilukhipa	Amenhotep III	Shuttarna II of Mitanni	–	–	–	–	–
	Sitamun	Amenhotep III	Amenhotep III	Tiye	–	–	–	–
	Iset	Amenhotep III	Amenhotep III	Tiye	–	–	–	–
	Daughter of Kurigalzu I of Babylon	Amenhotep III	Kurigalzu I	–	–	–	–	–
	Daughter of Kadashman-Enlil I of Babylon	Amenhotep III	Kadashman-Enlil I	–	–	–	–	–
	Daughter of Tarḫuntaradu of Arzawa	Amenhotep III	Tarḫuntaradu	–	–	–	–	–
	Daughter of the ruler of Ammia	Amenhotep III	Unknown king of Ammia	–	–	–	–	–
	Henut	Amenhotep III (?)	–	–	–	–	–	–
	Tadukhipa	Amenhotep III and Akhenaten	Tushratta of Mitanni	Juni	–	–	–	Some Egyptologists have theorised that she may the same person as Kiya.
	Nefertiti	Akhenaten	Ay (?)	–	–	Meritaten; Meketaten; Ankhesenamun; Neferneferuaten Tasherit; Neferneferure; Setepenre	–	Likely candidate for the female pharaoh Neferneferuaten (c. 1334–1332).
	Kiya	Akhenaten	–	–	–	Ankhesenpaaten Tasherit (?) and/or Meritaten Tasherit (?)	Amarna (?)	Possibly the same person as Tadukhipa. The usurpation of her monuments suggest that she may have been disgraced later in her husband's reign.
	The Younger Lady	Akhenaten	–	–	Tutankhamun	–	KV35	Unidentified sister–wife of Akhenaten. Possibly may be either Nebetah or Beketaten.
	Daughter of Burna–Buriash II	Akhenaten	Burna–Buriash II	–	–	–	–	Known from Amarna Letter EA 11, in which her father complains of the small envoy of five chariots sent to convey her to Egypt.
	Daughter of Šatiya	Akhenaten	Šatiya	–	–	–	–	Known from Amarna Letter EA 187.
	Meritaten	Smenkhkare	Akhenaten	Nefertiti	–	Meritaten Tasherit (?); Ankhesenpaaten Tasherit (?)	–	Theorised by some Egyptologists to have ruled as the female pharaoh Neferneferuaten later in her father's reign.
	Ankhesenamun	1) Akhenaten 2)Tutankhamun 3) Ay	Akhenaten	Nefertiti	–	With Tutankhamun: Two stillborn daughters	KV21 (?)	–
	Tey	Ay	–	–	Nakhtmin (?)	–	WV23 (?)	–
	Mutnedjmet (I)	Horemheb	Ay (?)	–	–	–	KV57	Theorised by some Egyptologists to be Nefertiti's sister.
	Nebetnehat	Unknown	–	–	–	–	Tomb WB1, Wadi Gabbanat el–Qurud	Married to a king from the mid–18th dynasty but it is unknown which king.

=== Nineteenth Dynasty (c. 1292–1189 BC) ===
Picture	Name	Spouse	Father	Mother	Sons	Daughters	Burial Place	Notes
	Sitre	Ramesses I	–	–	Seti I	–	QV38	May have previously been known as Tia
	Tuya	Seti I	Raia (Lieutenant of the chariotry)	Ruia	Ramesses II	Tia; Henutmire(?)	QV80	–
	Tanedjemet	Seti I or Ramesses II	Ramesses I (?)	–	–	–	QV33	–
	Nefertari	Ramesses II	–	–	Amun–her–khepeshef; Pareherwenemef; Meryre; Meryatum	Meritamen; Henuttawy; Baketmut; Nebettawy; Nefertari (?)	Tomb of Nefertari	–
	Isetnofret	Ramesses II	–	–	Ramesses; Khaemweset; Merneptah	Bintanath; Isetnofret (?)	Valley of the Queens (?)	–
	Henutmire	Ramesses II	Seti I	Tuya	–	–	QV75	–
	Maathorneferure	Ramesses II	Ḫattušili III	Puduḫepa	–	One daughter	Gurob (?)	–
	Meritamen	Ramesses II	Ramesses II	Nefertari	–	–	QV68	–
	Bintanath	Ramesses II	Ramesses II	Isetnofret	–	Unknown daughter	QV71	–
	Nebettawy	Ramesses II	Ramesses II	Nefertari	–	–	QV60	–
	Merytre	Ramesses II	Ramesses II	–	–	–	–	
	Isetnofret II	Merneptah	Either Ramesses II or Khaemweset	–	Seti II; Merenptah; Khaemwaset	Isetnofret	–	–
	Takhat	Seti II or Merneptah	Ramesses II (?)	–	Amenmesse	Tausret (?)	KV10	Depending on whether Amenmesse was a son or brother of Seti II, she may actually be a wife of Merneptah.
	Tausret	Seti II	–	Takhat (?)	Seti–Merenptah	Possibly one daughter	KV14	Ruled as regent for her stepson Siptah before becoming Pharaoh in her own right (c. 1191–1189).
	Tiaa	Seti II	–	–	–	–	–	–
	Sutailja	Seti II or Amenmesse (depending on who is the father of Siptah)	–	–	Siptah	–	–	Of Canaanite origin.

=== Twentieth Dynasty (c. 1189–1077 BC) ===
Picture	Name	Spouse	Father	Mother	Sons	Daughters	Burial Place	Notes
	Tiy–Merenese	Setnakhte	–	–	Ramesses III	–	–	–
	Iset Ta–Hemdjert	Ramesses III	–	Hemdjert	Ramesses VI	–	QV51	–
	Tyti	Ramesses III	Setnakhte (?)	–	Ramesses IV; Khaemwaset; Amun–her–khepeshef; Ramesses–Meryamen (?)	–	QV52	Previously believed to have been a wife of Ramesses X.
	Tiye (II)	Ramesses III	–	–	Pentawer	–	–	Instigated a harem conspiracy against her husband. Her ultimate fate is unknown.
	Duatentopet	Ramesses IV	Ramesses III	–	Ramesses V	–	QV74	–
	Henutwati	Ramesses V	–	–	–	–	–	–
	Tawerettenru	Ramesses V	–	–	–	–	–	–
	Nubkhesbed	Ramesses VI	–	–	Ramesses VII; Amenherkhepshef; Panebenkemyt	Iset	–	–
	Baketwernel	Ramesses IX	–	–	–	–	KV10	–
	Tentamun (I)	Ramesses XI	Nebseny	–	–	Duathathor–Henuttawy; Tentamun (?)	–	–

== Third Intermediate Period ==
=== Twenty-first Dynasty (c. 1077–943 BC) ===
Picture	Name	Spouse	Father	Mother	Sons	Daughters	Burial Place	Notes
	Tentamun (II)	Smendes	Ramesses XI	Tentamun (?)	–	–	–	–
	Mutnedjmet (II)	Psusennes I	Pinedjem I	Duathathor–Henuttawy	Amenemope (?)	–	NRT III, Tanis	–
	Wiay	Psusennes I	–	–	–	Isetemkheb	–	–
	Karimala	Siamun or Psusennes II	Osorkon the Elder	–	–	–	–	–

=== Wives of the High Priests of Amun (c. 1080–943 BC) ===
While they were mostly not officially pharaohs, the High Priests of Amun at Thebes were the de facto rulers of Upper Egypt during the Twenty–first dynasty, writing their names in cartouches and being buried in royal tombs. Their wives would have held a similar status to most other queens.

Picture	Name	Spouse	Father	Mother	Sons	Daughters	Burial Place	Notes
	Hrere	Piankh (?)	–	–	–	Nodjmet	–	May have actually been a wife of Amenhotep.
	Nodjmet	Herihor	Amenhotep (High Priest of Amun) (?)	Hrere	Pinedjem I, Heqanefer, Heqamaat, Ankhefenmut	Faienmut	Royal Cache	May have been also been married to Piankh.
	Duathathor–Henuttawy	Pinedjem I	Ramesses XI	Tentamun	Psusennes I, Masharta, Menkheperre	Mutnedjmet, Maatkare, Henuttawy	Royal Cache	–
	Isetemkheb	Pinedjem I	–	–	–	–	–	–
	Tentnabehenu	Pinedjem I	–	–	–	Nauny	–	–
	Tayuheret	Masaharta	–	–	–	–	Royal Cache	–
	Djedmutesankh	Djedkhonsuefankh	–	–	–	–	MMA 60	–
	Isetemkheb	Menkheperre	Psusennes I	Wiay	Pinedjem II, Smendes II, Pasebkhanut; Hori	Isetemkheb, Henuttawy, Meryetamun, Gautseshen	–	–
	Henuttawy	Smendes II	Menkheperre	Isetemkheb	–	Isetemkheb	MMA 60	–
	Tahentdjehuty	Smendes II	–	–	–	Neskhons	–	–
	Isetemkheb	Pinedjem II	Menkheperre	Isetemkheb	Psusennes II	Harweben, Henuttawy	Royal Cache	–
	Neskhons	Pinedjem II	Smendes II	Tahentdjehuty	Tjanefer, Masaharta	Itawy, Nesitanebetashru	Royal Cache	–

=== Twenty-second Dynasty (First Libyan dynasty) (c. 943–720 BC) ===
Picture	Name	Spouse	Father	Mother	Sons	Daughters	Burial Place	Notes
	Karomama (I)	Shoshenq I	–	–	Osorkon I	–	–	–
	Penreshnes	Shoshenq I	–	–	Nimlot	–	–	–
	Maatkare	Osorkon I	Psusennes II	–	Shoshenq	–	–	–
	Tashedkhonsu	Osorkon I	–	–	Takelot I	–	–	–
	Shepensopdet	Osorkon I	–	–	Osorkon	–	–	–
	Nesitaudjatakhet	Shoshenq II	–	–	Osorkon	–	–	–
	Nesitanebetashru	Shoshenq II	–	–	Harsiese	–	–	–
	Kapes	Takelot I	–	–	Osorkon II	–	–	–
	Karomama (II)	Osorkon II	Takelot I	–	Shoshenq; Hornakht	Tashakheper; Karomama [Ta?]iirmer	–	Known as Karomama I.
	Isetemkheb	Osorkon II	–	–	–	Tjesbastperu	–	–
	Djedmutesankh	Osorkon II	–	–	Nimlot	–	–	–
	Djedbastiusankh	Shoshenq III	–	–	Takelot	–	–	–
	Tadibast II	Shoshenq III	–	–	Bakennefi	–	–	–
	Tentamenopet	Shoshenq III	–	–	–	Ankhenesshoshenq	–	–
	Tjesbastperu	Shoshenq III	Osorkon II	–	–	–	–	–
	Tadibast III	Shoshenq V (?)	–	–	Osorkon IV	–	–	–

=== Twenty-third Dynasty (Second Libyan dynasty) (c. 837–720 BC) ===
Picture	Name	Spouse	Father	Mother	Sons	Daughters	Burial Place	Notes
	Karomama (III)	Takelot II	Nimlot (High Priest of Amun)	Tentsepeh	Osorkon III	–	Thebes?	Granddaughter of Osorkon II. Known as Karomama II.
	Tashep	Takelot II	–	–	Nimlot	–	–	–
	Tabeketenasket	Takelot II	–	–	–	Isetweret	–	–
	Tentsai	Osorkon III	–	–	Takelot III	–	–	–
	Karoadjet	Osorkon III	–	–	–	–	–	–
	Irtiubast	Takelot III	Osorkon III (?)	–	Osorkon	–	–	–
	Kakat	Takelot III	–	–	–	Irbastwedjanefu	–	–
	Betjet	Takelot III	–	–	–	–	–	–

=== Twenty-fourth Dynasty (c. 732–720 BC) ===
No known Queens from this dynasty.

=== Twenty-fifth Dynasty (Kushite Dynasty) (c. 760–656 BC) ===
Picture	Name	Spouse	Father	Mother	Sons	Daughters	Burial Place	Notes
	Pebatjma	Kashta	–	–	Piye, Shabaka	Khensa, Peksater, Amenirdis I, Neferukakashta (?)	–	–
	Tabiry	Piye	Alara of Kush	Kasaqa	–	–	Pyramid Ku53 in El–Kurru, Nubia	–
	Abar	Piye	–	–	Taharqa	–	Nuri, Tomb 35 (?)	Niece of Alara of Kush.
	Khensa	Piye	Kashta	Pebatjma	–	–	El–Kurru Pyramid Ku4	–
	Peksater	Piye	Kashta	Pebatjma	–	–	Cemetery D in Abydos	–
	Nefrukekashta	Piye	Kashta	Pebatjma (?)	–	–	El–Kurru Pyramid K.52	–
	Arty	Shebitku	Piye	–	–	–	El–Kurru Pyramid Ku6	–
	Qalhata	Shabaka	Piye	–	Tantamani	–	El–Kurru Pyramid Ku5	–
	Mesbat	Shabaka	–	–	Haremakhet (?)	–	–	–
	Tabekenamun	Taharqa	Piye	–	–	–	–	May be wife of Shabaka.
	Takahatenamun	Taharqa	Piye	–	–	–	Tomb 21 at Nuri (?)	–
	Naparaye	Taharqa	Piye	–	–	–	El–Kurru Pyramid Ku3	–
	Atakhebasken	Taharqa	–	–	–	–	Nuri Tomb Nu36	–
	Piankharty	Tantamani	–	–	–	–	–	–
	[..]salka	Tantamani	–	–	–	–	–	–
	Malaqaye	Tantamani (?)	–	–	–	–	–	–

== Late Period ==
=== Twenty-sixth Dynasty (Saite Dynasty) (672–525 BC) ===
Picture	Name	Spouse	Father	Mother	Sons	Daughters	Burial Place	Notes
	Istemabet	Necho I	–	–	Psamtik I	–	–	–
	Mehytenweskhet	Psamtik I	Harsiese (High Priest of Re)	–	Necho II	Nitocris I Meryetneith	Medinet Habu	–
	Khedebneithirbinet I	Necho II	–	–	Psamtik II	–	Samannud (?)	–
	Takhuit	Psamtik II	–	–	Apries	Ankhnesneferibre	Athribis	–
	Tentkheta	Amasis II	Padineith (Priest of Ptah)	–	Khnum–ib–Re; Psamtik III	–	–	–
	Nakhtubasterau	Amasis II	–	–	Pasenenkhonsu; Ahmose	–	Giza Tomb LG83	–
	Ladice	Amasis II	Battus III of Cyrene	Pheretima	–	–	–	Married the Pharaoh some time after 548 BC and returned to Cyrene in 525 BC.
	Khetbeneiterboni II	Amasis II	Apries	–	–	–	–	–
	Tadiasir	Amasis II	–	–	–	Tashereniset	–	–

=== Twenty-seventh Dynasty (First Persian Dynasty) (525–404 BC) ===
The Persian kings of Egypt generally ruled the country from afar and thus their wives played little to no part in Egyptian life and culture. As stated by Egyptologist Joyce Tyldesley, "to all intents and purposes, Egypt was without a queen throughout the 27th and 31st Dynasties".

Picture	Name	Spouse	Father	Mother	Sons	Daughters	Burial Place	Notes
	Atossa	1) Cambyses 2) Darius I	Cyrus the Great	Cassandane	With Darius I: Xerxes I, Achaemenes, Masistes, Hystaspes	–	Naqsh–e Rostam	–
	Roxane	Cambyses	Cyrus the Great	–	–	–	–	A sister of Cambyses according to Herodotus. However, Ctesias does not mention her being a sister of Cambyses.
	Phaidyme	1) Bardiya 2) Darius I	Otanes	–	–	–	–	–
	Artystone	Darius I	Cyrus the Great	Cassandane	Arsames, Gobryas	Artazostre	–	–
	Parmys	Darius I	Bardiya	–	Ariomardus	–	–	–
	Phratogune	Darius I	–	–	Abrocomes, Hyperanthes	–	–	–
	Amestris	Xerxes I	Otanes	A sister of Darius	Darius, Hystaspes, Artaxerxes I, Achaemenes	Amytis, Rhodogune	–	–
	Damaspia	Artaxerxes I	–	–	Xerxes II	–	–	–
	Alogyne of Babylon	Artaxerxes I	–	–	Sogdianus	–	–	–
	Cosmartidene of Babylon	Artaxerxes I	–	–	Darius II, Arsites	–	–	–
	Andia of Babylon	Artaxerxes I	–	–	Bogapaeus	Parysatis	–	–
	Parysatis	Darius II	Artaxerxes I	Andia of Babylon	Artaxerxes II, Cyrus, Artostes, Ostanes, Oxendra	Amestris, Stateira	–	–

=== Twenty-eighth and Twenty-ninth Dynasties (404–380 BC) ===
No known Queens from these dynasties.

=== Thirtieth Dynasty (380–343 BC) ===
Picture	Name	Spouse	Father	Mother	Sons	Daughters	Burial Place	Notes
	Khedebneithirbinet II	Nectanebo II	Teos	–	–	–	–	Last Native Queen Consort Of Ancient Egypt

=== Thirty-first Dynasty (Second Persian Dynasty) (343–332 BC) ===
Picture	Name	Spouse	Father	Mother	Sons	Daughters	Burial Place	Notes
	Atossa	Artaxerxes III	–	–	Arses	–	–	–
	Stateira (I)	Darius III	–	–	Ariobarzanes	Stateira (II), Drypetis	–	–

== Hellenistic Period ==
=== Argead dynasty (332–309 BC) ===
Picture	Name	Spouse	Father	Mother	Sons	Daughters	Burial Place	Notes
	Roxana	Alexander the Great	Oxyartes of Bactria	–	Unknown first son (Alexander?), Alexander IV	–	–	Married Alexander in 327 BC.
	Stateira (II)	Alexander the Great	Darius III	Stateira (I)	–	–	–	Married Alexander in 324 BC.
	Parysatis II	Alexander the Great	Artaxerxes III	–	–	–	–	Married Alexander in 324 BC.
	Eurydice II of Macedon	Philip III	Amyntas IV	Cynna	–	–	–	–

=== Ptolemaic dynasty (305–30 BC) ===
Most Queens of this dynasty starting with Arsinoe II held power as co–rulers with their husbands. Below is a list of consorts who are not known to have held power as co–rulers.

Picture	Name	Spouse	Father	Mother	Sons	Daughters	Burial Place	Notes
	Eurydice	Ptolemy I Soter	Antipater	–	Ptolemy Ceraunus, Meleager, Agathocles (?), Argeus (?)	Ptolemais, Lysandra	–	
	Berenice I	Ptolemy I Soter	Magas of Macedon	Antigone of Macedon	Ptolemy II Philadelphus	Arsinoe II, Philotera	–	–
	Arsinoe I	Ptolemy II Philadelphus	Lysimachus	Nicaea of Macedon	Ptolemy III Euergetes, Lysimachus	Berenice	–	Exiled to Coptos by Ptolemy II.
	Cleopatra IV	Ptolemy IX Soter	Ptolemy VIII Physcon	Cleopatra III	–	Berenice III (possibly)	–	First wife of Ptolemy IX. She was never included as co–ruler in protocols dating, nor she is known to have Pharaoh's titulary.
	Cleopatra Selene	1) Ptolemy IX Soter 2) Ptolemy X Alexander I	Ptolemy VIII Physcon	Cleopatra III	–	–	–	Unlike most Queens of this period, she was not made co–ruler due to the influence of her mother Cleopatra III. After Ptolemy IX Soter was driven out of Egypt by his mother in 107 BC, Cleopatra Selene married her brother Ptolemy X Alexander I. In 102 BC, she was forced by her mother to divorce Ptolemy X and marry Antiochus VIII Grypus of the Seleucid Empire to seal an alliance. She is sometimes named Cleopatra V due to the general confusion over the numbering of the queens named Cleopatra.
	Seleucus VII Philometor	Berenice IV	Antiochus X Eusebes	Cleopatra Selene	–	–	–	Murdered on the orders of Berenice IV after a few days of marriage.
	Archelaus	Berenice IV	Archelaus (General)	–	–	–	–	While there is a possibility he was a co-regent, there is no confirmed proof of this.
	Mark Antony	Cleopatra VII	Marcus Antonius Creticus	Julia	Alexander Helios, Ptolemy Philadelphus	Cleopatra Selene II	–	–

== See also ==
- Great Royal Wife
- God's Wife of Amun
- List of pharaohs
- List of Roman and Byzantine empresses – Consorts of the Roman and Byzantine emperors who ruled Egypt from 30 BC to AD 642.
- List of consorts of the Muhammad Ali dynasty – Egyptian royal consorts from 1805 to 1953.

== Bibliography ==
- Ashton, Sally-Ann (2003). The Last Queens of Egypt. Pearson. ISBN 0-582-77210-9.
- Baker, Darrell D. (2008). Encyclopedia of the Pharaohs Volume 1: Predynastic to the Twentieth Dynasty 3300-1069 BC. Egypt: The American University in Cairo Press. ISBN 978-977-416-221-3.
- Dodson, Aidan; Hilton, Dyan (2010). The Complete Royal Families of Ancient Egypt. United Kingdom: Thames & Hudson. ISBN 978-0-500-28857-3.
- Grajetzki, Wolfram (2005). Ancient Egyptian Queens: A Hieroglyphic Dictionary. London: Golden House Publications. ISBN 978-0954721893.
- Ryholt, Kim (1997). The Political Situation in Egypt during the Second Intermediate Period, c.1800–1550 BC. Vol. 20. Copenhagen: Carsten Niebuhr Institute Publications/Museum Tusculanum Press. ISBN 8772894210.
- Tyldesley, Joyce (2006). Chronicle of the Queens of Egypt. United Kingdom: Thames & Hudson. ISBN 0-500-05145-3.
