= Neferhetepes (princess) =

sw t zA n t X t f nfr Htp p t s
- Burial place: Giza, Giza Governorate, Egypt
- Years active: c. 2420 BC

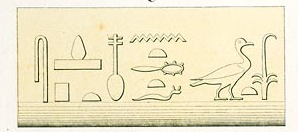
Lintle with name Neferhetepes

Neferhetepes (fl. c. 2420 BC) was an Ancient Egyptian king's daughter who is only known from her mastaba tomb at Giza (G 4714). She bears the title king's daughter of his body. She most likely lived in the 5th Dynasty (c. 2498 BC - c. 2345 BC).

The mastababa of Neferhetepes was discovered and published by the expedition under Karl Richard Lepsius who published the door lintle providing her name and title. In 1915, the tomb was excavated again by George Reisner. By now the inscription was gone.

The parents of Neferhetepes are not known. Her burial is not far from that of queen Nimaathap II. A connection of these two women is possible but there is no firm evidence for it.
