= Khuit I =

Queen consort of Egypt

- Royal Wife, King's Daughter
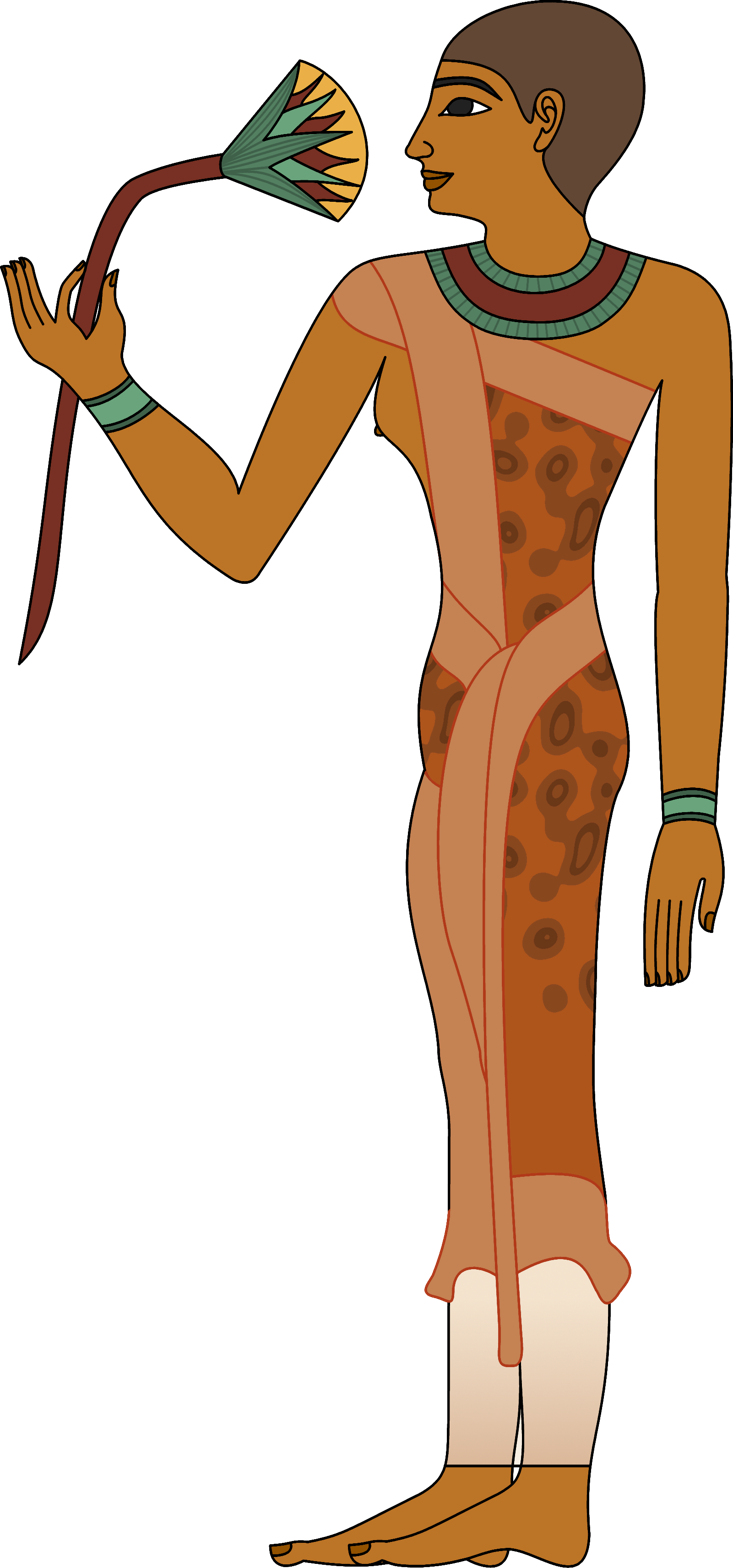
- An impression showing how Khuit I might have been represented in art, based on Old Kingdom iconography
- Born: c. 2400 ± 100 BCE
- Died: c. 2400 ± 100 BCE
- Burial: c. 2400 ± 100 BCE; Saqqara
- Spouse: Unas (?); Menkauhor Kaiu (?)
Egyptian name
x w i t
- Transliteration: ḫwỉt
- Dynasty: Fifth of Egypt
- Father: Unidentified Fifth Dynasty pharaoh
- Mother: Unidentified consort
- Religion: Ancient Egyptian

Khuit I was an ancient Egyptian queen who has been tentatively dated by association to have lived during the 5^{th} Dynasty of the Old Kingdom.

== Life ==
Attestation of Khuit I is poor, and little can be said of her for certain. There is consensus among scholars that she most probably lived during the latter half of the 5^{th} Dynasty.

By process of elimination, Austrian Egyptologist Wilfried Seipel suggests that she was a queen of the 5^{th} Dynasty pharaoh Menkauhor Kaiu, through attribution of pharaohs to queens whose marriages are more concretely understood. This proposition has been criticised by French Egyptologist Michel Baud, who notes the precedent that pharaohs might entertain more than one queen simultaneously. Instead, Baud proffers that the pharaoh Unas may also qualify as a candidate, owing to congruencies in the style of inscriptional titles belonging to other queens.

Were Khuit I to have been a royal wife of Unas, she may have lived contemporaneously with other royal women of his court Nebet I and Khenut I. On the contrary, in accordance with Seipel's proposition, Khuit I may have lived around the time of Meresankh IV, another queen proposed to have been a wife of Menkauhor Kaiu based on his burial's proximal affiliation, however the datation of Meresankh IV's reign is also uncertain.

During the course of her life, Khuit I held the following titles:

- Royal Wife
- King's Daughter
- King's Acquaintance
- Great of Praises

M23 X1 N41 U7 D21 X1 I9 M17 U1 Aa1 F39 Aa1 D21 D4 Q1 R8
The Royal Wife, his beloved, revered before Osiris
ḥmt-nswt mrt.f ỉmꜣḫ[t] ḫr wsỉr
in hieroglyphs
Era: Old Kingdom
(2686–2181 BC)

Her accompanying epithets include beloved of the King; she who sees Horus and Set; she who is revered before Osiris; Great of Charm and Great of Knowledge.

The title of King's Daughter establishes her as a princess by birth, and, owing to her title of Royal Wife, later, a queen.

== Family ==
Khuit I is attested as the Royal Wife and daughter to two unnamed pharaohs respectively. This places her firmly within the royal line and implies that she may have intermarried with her husband.

== Burial ==
Khuit I was laid to rest in mastaba D 14 (no. 70) in Saqqara.

Discovered by French archaeologist and Egyptologist Auguste Mariette in the late 19^{th} century, the state of the mastaba was recorded for the publication of Les Mastabas de l'Ancien Empire. He assessed it to have been constructed of limestone and noted its poor condition.

Of the mastaba itself, he reported it to have been buried beneath sand and littered with innumerable fragments of limestone, with its chamber presumably having deteriorated in antiquity.

According to Mariette's account, a stele framing dedicatory inscriptions found within the mastaba was accidentally destroyed during the course of excavation prior to it being recorded. Nonetheless, Mariette recorded two limestone blocks and accompanying inscriptional detail which attests Khuit I's ownership of the mastaba, her relationship to the royal family, and other titles she held during her life.

With regards to its datation, Seipel argues that its proximity to other more satisfactorily dated burials places it within the 5^{th} Dynasty.

== Attestations ==
Khuit I is known only from Mariette's record of her mastaba. There are only three instances where she is securely attested by name. Though her face has long since been lost, she is portrayed in bas-relief on the wall of her mastaba, breathing in the aroma of a flower.

M17 X1 G43 Aa1 G39 N35 X1 N35 M23
The King's Daughter, Khuit
sꜣ[t] n nswt ḫwỉt
in hieroglyphs
Era: Old Kingdom
(2686–2181 BC)

The attribution of the title King's Daughter was found in the entryway of the mastaba.

M23 X1 D21 Aa1 Aa1 G43 M17 X1
The King's Acquaintance, Khuit
nswt-rḫ ḫwỉt
in hieroglyphs
Era: Old Kingdom
(2686–2181 BC)

The title of King's Acquaintance was found inscribed above the only known depiction of Khuit I.

M17 U1 M17 M17 Aa1 D21 M23 N41 X1 Aa1 G43 M17 X1
Revered before the Royal Wife Khuit
ỉmꜣḫy ḫr ḥmt-nswt ḫwỉt
in hieroglyphs
Era: Old Kingdom
(2686–2181 BC)

A reference attributing Khuit I with her queenly status, Royal Wife, was found on a bas relief fragment which may have captioned an associated figure.
