= Sheretnebty =

Ancient Egyptian princess of the Fifth Dynasty

G16 S r t fnD B1
Srt nb.tj
- Born: c. 2430 BC
- Died: c. 2400 BC (aged c. 30)
- Burial place: Giza, Egypt

A corridor of statues in the antechamber of Sheretnebty’s tomb

Sheretnebty (c. 2430 BC - c. 2400 BC) was an ancient Egyptian princess of the Fifth Dynasty, with the title king's daughter of his body, his beloved. She is believed to be the daughter of Nyuserre Ini. Her name means nose of the two Ladies

== Tomb ==
In 2012, Archaeologists from the Czech Institute of Egyptology unearthed her tomb located in the Abusir region, south of Cairo. Her burial was found within the rock-cut tomb, which most likely belonged to her husband, whose name is unknown. He may have been related to the Shepseskafankh Family.

The tomb complex contained six burial shafts. The biggest one most likely belonged to the princess's husband. The second shaft was approximately 10 meters deep, with an unfinished burial chamber on the west. Inside this chamber, human remains of a woman, likely Sheretnebty, were found. She was around 25 to 40 years old at the time of her death.
