= Nebunebty =

Queen consort of Egypt

S12 G16
nbw nbtj
- Royal Wife
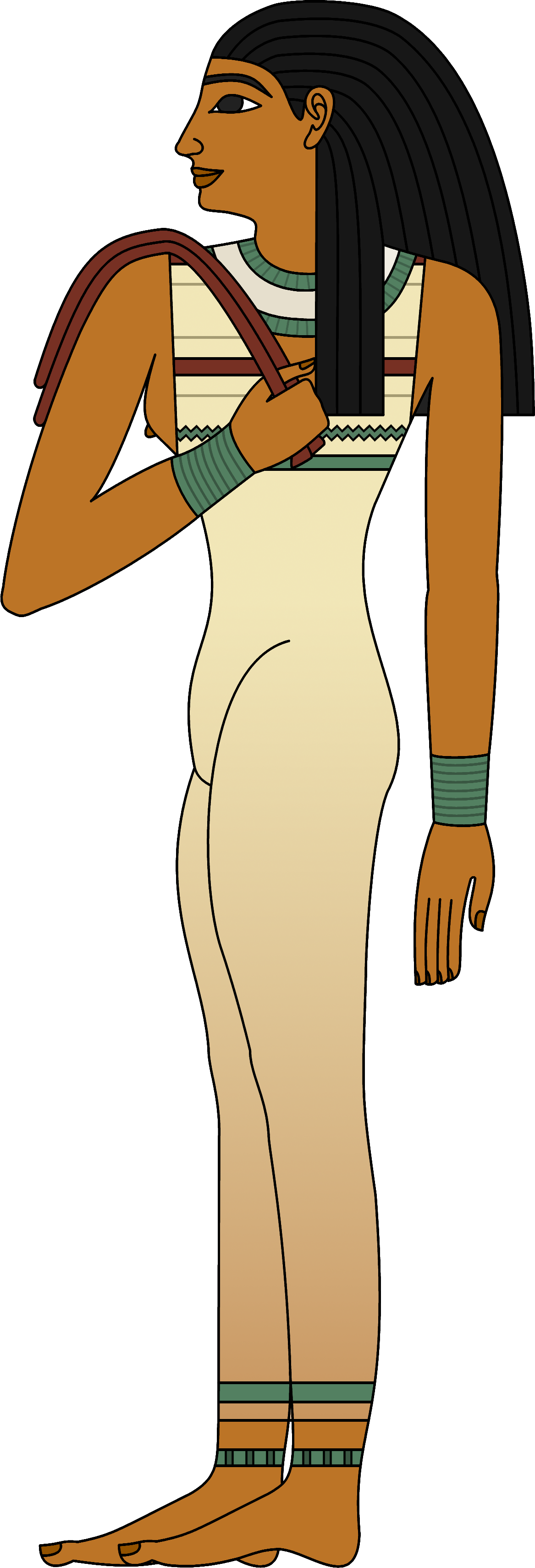
- An impression showing how queen Nebunebty might have been represented in art, based on Old Kingdom iconography

Queen consort of Egypt
- Reign: c. 2450 BC
- Burial: Badrashin, Giza, Egypt
- Issue: Possibly Nebuibnebty
- Religion: Ancient Egyptian

Nebunebty (also Nebunebti; fl. c. 2450 BC) was an ancient Egyptian queen consort who has been tentatively associated with the 5th Dynasty of the Old Kingdom. Her name translates as 'the gold of the Two Ladies', or 'golden are the Two Ladies'.

== Life ==
Nebunebty is poorly attested, and the particulars of her reign are highly uncertain. It has been proposed that she lived during the 5th or 6th Dynasty, though French Egyptologist Michel Baud felt that this range might be narrowed down to the first half of the 5th Dynasty, on account of the datation of other monuments surrounding her burial.

Austrian Egyptologist Wilfried Seipel suggests she may have been a queen to the king Shepseskare as part of a wider proposition concerning the marriages of royal women of the 5th Dynasty. Baud criticises Seipel's methodology, observing that kings might entertain several wives concurrently. Baud suggests a wider date range that includes the reigns of Neferirkare, Neferefre, Shepseskare, and Nyuserre.

Baud's assessment has been countered by Vivienne Gae Callender, who contends that the peculiarities of the titulary recorded in Nebunebty's mastaba likely relate her to women known to have lived during the reign of Djedkare. Callender theorises that Nebunebty may have been a wife of Menkauhor, noting the possibility, were Nebunebty to have survived him, that she could have been interred during the reign of his successor Djedkare.

Callender also draws parallels between the offering formulae detailed on her tomb and those of Habauptah, an official who served multiple kings of the 5th Dynasty, finding that they are largely identical. Callender therefore assumes Habauptah to have been a contemporary.

== Titulary ==
During the course of her life, Nebunebty was accorded the title of Royal Wife.

In addition, several epithets are bestowed in the inscriptions found at her burial: she who sees Horus and Set, great one of the Hetes-Sceptre, she who sits in the presence of Horus, companion of Horus, Great of Praise, she who is joined to the beloved of the Two Ladies and the King and honoured by the King, by Osiris, and by the Great God.

The title Royal Wife makes clear that she was married to a king, and thus of royal stature, but there exists no evidence to suggest that she was a princess prior to her marriage.

== Family ==
Nebunebty's burial offers no surviving mention of her parentage or her issue, and her husband is referenced only by the title of king.

Regarding the royal women of Nebunebty's probable dynasty, Callender considers the references to gold and to the Two Ladies characteristic of women alive around the time of Nyuserre and thereafter. She postulates that Nebuibnebty, a contemporaneous figure of likely royal stature, could have been a daughter of Nebunebty on account of the similarities between their names. She acknowledges, however, that this is conjectural.

== Burial ==
Nebunebty was buried in mastaba D 18 (no. 64) in Saqqara, lying some way north of Djoser's burial complex. According to Jánosi, Nebunebty's mastaba is one of only a few peculiar cases of a burial in Saqqara having little or no apparent association with its nearby pyramid complex.

The mastaba was unearthed by Austrian Egyptologist Auguste Mariette in the latter half of the 19th century, whose exploits in Saqqara were published in Les Mastabas de l'Ancien Empire.

Mariette observed at the time of excavation that the mastaba was in a good state of preservation. He assessed it to have consisted of several rooms whose walls were plastered with white stucco. However, other than two short inscriptions bearing record of Nebunebty, her titles and her epithets, there remained nothing else of note. After establishing that the mastaba contained no serdab or stelae, he refocussed his efforts elsewhere, leaving the rest of the mastaba unexcavated.
