= Meretnebty =

Queen consort of Egypt
- Tenure: c. 2485 BC
- Spouse: Sahure
- Religion: Ancient Egyptian Religion

Meretnebty (fl. c. 2485 BC) was a queen consort of Egypt as a wife of king Sahure. She lived during the 5th Dynasty and was named after Two Ladies, a pair of Egyptian goddesses who protected the king.

== Biography ==
Meretnebty's parents are not known. She is depicted with her husband in his mortuary temple at Abusir. In the temple, she is shown next to the mother of Sahure, Neferhetepes, both holding their hands. That is a highly unusual depiction and might indicate a close relationship between both. Perhaps Neferhetepes was her mother. In the mortuary temple, several sons are mentioned. Their names are Horemsaf, Netjerirenre, Khakare, and Nebankhre. It is not clear if these princes are the sons of Meretnebty or possibly of another wife. Meretnebty's titles include those of great of praises, she who sees Horus and Seth, king’s wife, his beloved, and companion of Horus.

Sahure and Meretnebty's children may have been Princes Ranefer and Netjerirenre. According to Miroslav Verner, Ranefer took the throne as Neferirkare Kakai, and Netjerirenre may have later taken the throne as Shepseskare.

The queen was known for a long time from depictions in the pyramid temple of Sahure. However, the name there was partly destroyed and was reconstructed as Neferet-ha-Nebti or Neferetnebti. In more recent excavations, blocks with depictions of the queen were found and her name is completely preserved as Meretnebty.
