= Shepseskaf-ankh =

Shepseskaf-ankh was an ancient Egyptian physician and priest. He was the Head of the Physicians of Upper and Lower Egypt and served the pharaoh household during the Fifth Dynasty.

His tomb was discovered by Czech archaeologists in Abusir in 2013.

Shepseskaf-ankh held a number of important titles, many of them connected to his position as physician at the royal court, but he also held several important priestly titles. His titles:

- acquaintance of the king
- overseer of the healing substances of the great house (this title was so far not yet attested)
- wab priest of the king
- great of the physicians of Upper and Lower Egypt
- priest of Re in Nekhenre (Nekhenre is the name of the sun temple of king Userkaf)
- priest of Re in Setibre (Setibre is the name of the sun temple of king Neferirkare)
- priest of Re in Sesepibre (Sesepibre is the name of the sun temple of king Niuserre)
- priest of Horus of Shenut
- priest of Heka
- priest of Hathor in all places
- priest of Khnum. who is the first in the house of life and in the house of protection
- priest of the Red Crown
- keeper of the king's secrets
- physician of the great house

The burial place of Shepseskaf-ankh was discovered at Abusir. It is a mastaba with eight burial shafts. The mastaba measures 21/90 × 11.5 meters. It is still to about 1.6 meters high. The outer walls were built of stones. At the east side there is a cult chapel. The only decorated part is a false door inscribed with the titles of Shepseskaf-ankh and showing his person standing.
