= Nebet (queen) =

n nb b t

Queen consort of Egypt
- Tenure: c. 2360 BC
- King: Unas
- Burial: Badrshein, Giza, Egypt
- Spouse: Unas

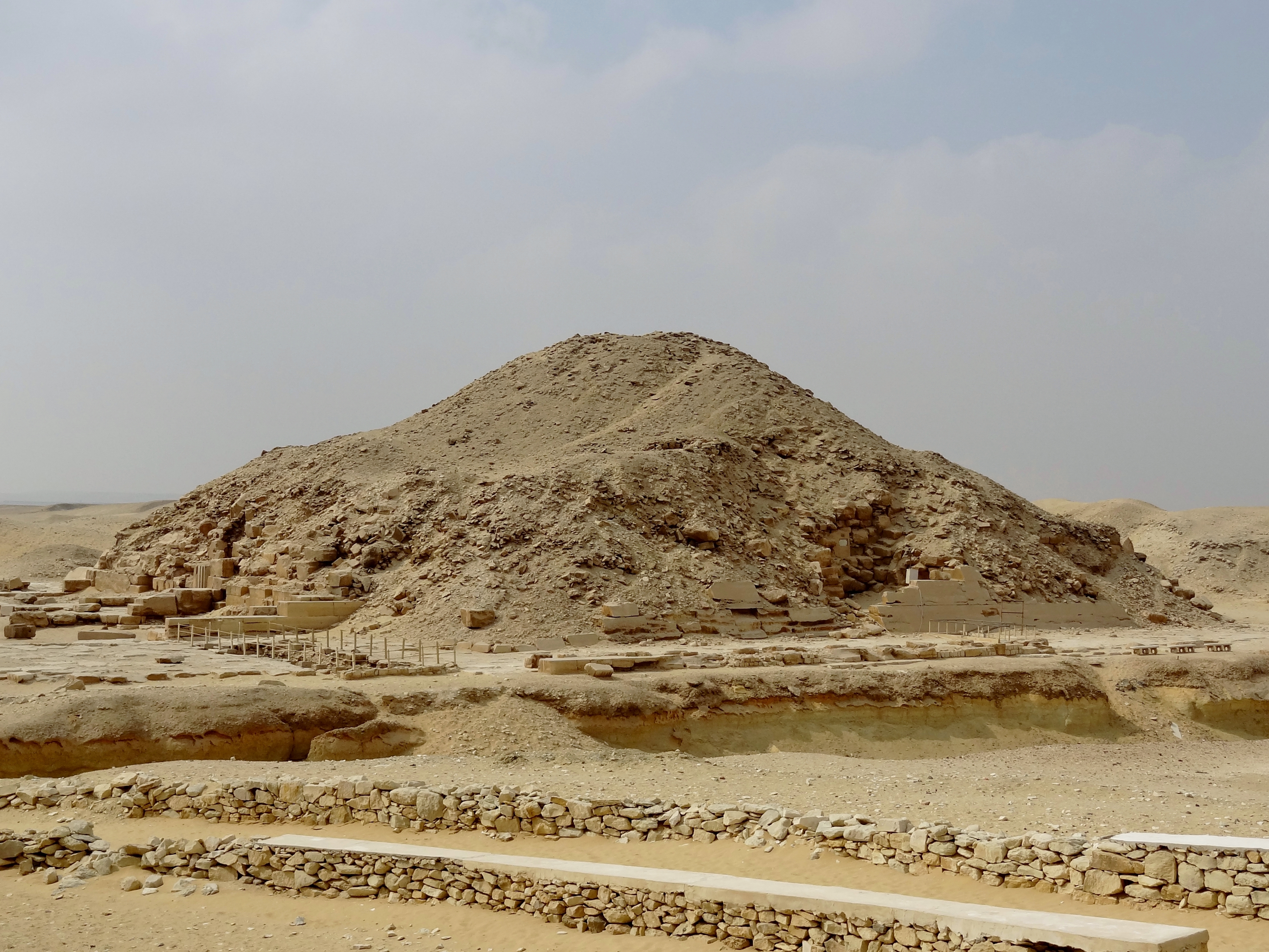
Pyramid of Unas in Egypt

Nebet (fl. c. 2360 BC) was an Egyptian queen, the wife of King Unas. She lived during the time of the Fifth Dynasty of Egypt. She is held the mother of the Crown Prince Unas-ankh, though this fact is disputed. In addition to Unas Anch, Nebet may also be the mother of Khentkaues, Neferut, and Nefertkaues.

== Tomb ==
Nebet was buried in a double mastaba with another queen, Khenut, next to the Pyramid of Unas in Saqqara. The mastaba was excavated by Peter Munro.

== Titles ==
Nebet's titles are: "Great One of the hetes-sceptre" (wrt-hetes), "She who sees Horus and Seth" (mȝȝt-ḥrw-stẖ), "Great of Praises" (wrt-ḥzwt), "King's Wife, his beloved" (ḥmt-nsw mryt.f), "Consort and Beloved of the Two Ladies" (smȝyt-mry-nbty), "Attendant of the Great One" (ḫtt-wr), "Companion of Horus" (smrt-ḥrw), "Companion of Horus, his beloved" (smrt-ḥrw-mryt.f) and "Companion of Horus" (tist-ḥrw).

Even though she bears the titles of a queen, she is depicted in her tomb as a high-ranking woman without any of the insignia of a queen.

She had her own estates, which were administered by women.
