= Merytre =

Ancient Egyptian princess and queen

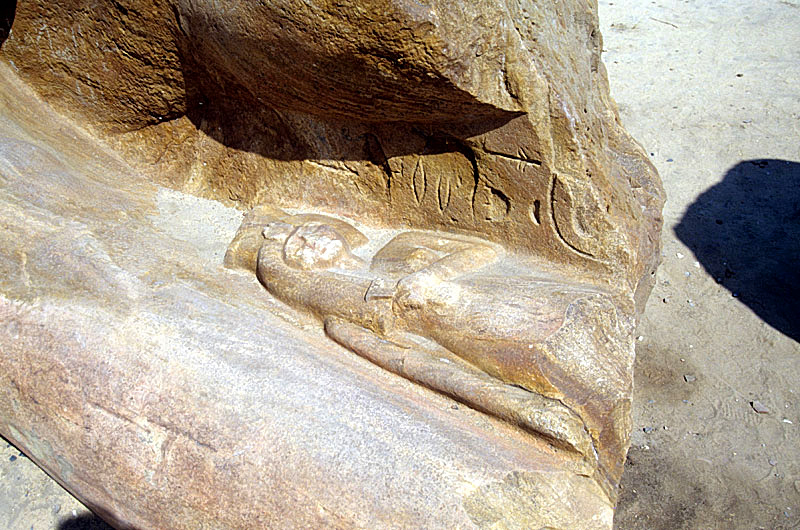
Princess Merytre, carved on the lower part of Ramesses II's colossus

Merytre was the daughter and wife of the ancient Egyptian king Ramesses II. She is so far only known from a colossal statue of the king that was found at Tanis. There, she is shown as small figure between the legs of the king. The partly destroyed caption reads beloved king's daughter, King's wife Merytre. The Great Royal Wife Bintanath is also depicted on the statue (as a relief on one side). Merytre might have been married to the king at about the same time Bintanath was married, that is from about the 34th to the 42nd year of the king's reign.
