= Neferhetepes (wife of Userkaf) =

Wife of Ancient Egyptian King Userkaf

nfr Htp t p s

Queen consort of Egypt
- Tenure: c. 2480 BC
- Died: c. 2480 BC
- Spouse: Most likely Userkaf
- Issue: Sahure
- Religion: Ancient Egyptian Religion

Neferhetepes (died c. 2480 BC) was a queen of Ancient Egypt. She was the mother of Sahure, and most likely the wife of king Userkaf, the first king of the Fifth Dynasty.

== Biography ==
She was the mother of king Sahure, Userkaf's successor, and she was most likely the mother of Meretnebty, Sahure's wife. Neferhetepes' most important titles were mother of the king of Upper and Lower Egypt and daughter of the god.

Neferhetepes was known for a long time from a reference in the tomb of the official Persen. His tomb is not far away from the pyramid of Userkaf, and therefore, there were some speculations about her identity and her relation to this king. However, several reliefs were found recently at the causeway of the pyramid belonging to king Sahure. Here, Neferhetepes is shown as mother of King Sahure, and she was therefore most likely the wife of Userkaf, Sahure's predecessor.

== Death ==
She most likely lived until the end of Sahures' reign, and is therefore not the same person as the king's daughter Neferhetepes of the Fourth Dynasty.

=== Tomb ===
At Saqqara, the small Pyramid Complex of Neferhetepes was next to Userkaf's pyramid.

== Bibliography ==
- El Awady, T., & Abusir, X. V. I. (2009). Sahure–The Pyramid Causeway. History and Decoration Program in the Old Kingdom, Abusir XVI, Prague.
