= Meritaten Tasherit =

Ancient Egyptian princess

Egyptian name
i t n ra N36 t B1 t&A S r t A17
- Dynasty: 18th Dynasty
- Father: Akhenaten or Smenkhkare
- Mother: Meritaten or Kiya
- Religion: Atenism

Meritaten Tasherit, which means Meritaten the Younger was an ancient Egyptian princess of the 18th Dynasty. She is likely to have been the daughter of Meritaten, eldest daughter of Pharaoh Akhenaten.

Who her father was remains a matter of debate. Many assume it to be Meritaten's father, Akhenaten, or possibly her husband Smenkhkare. Since both Meritaten Tasherit and another princess, Ankhesenpaaten Tasherit appear only in texts that once mentioned Akhenaten's second wife Kiya, it is also possible that they were children of Akhenaten and Kiya, or that they were fictional, replacing the name of Kiya's daughter, who might have been Beketaten, more commonly thought to be Tiye's child.

Meritaten Tasherit's fate is uncertain. The mention of the god Aten in her name suggests that she was indeed a daughter of Akhenaten, since his successors reverted his religious reforms, and reverted to the worship of Egypt's traditional gods. The name Aten was dropped from popular use during this time.
