= Khenut =

Ancient Egyptian queen consort

Aa1 n W24 t w

Queen consort of Egypt
- Tenure: c. 2360 BC
- King: Unas
- Burial: Badrshein, Giza, Egypt
- Spouse: Unas

Khenut (fl. c. 2360 BC) was the queen consort of Egypt as the wife of King Unas. She lived during the time of the Fifth Dynasty of Egypt. She was a suspected mother of Queen Iput.

== Burial ==
Khenut was buried in a double mastaba with another queen named Nebet next to the Pyramid of Unas in Saqqara. The mastaba was excavated by Peter Munro.

The pyramid of the Queen mother Sesheshet lies near the pyramid which belong to Khenut.

== Titles ==
Khenut’s titles are: "Great One of the hetes-sceptre" (wrt-hetes), "She who sees Horus and Set" (mȝȝt-ḥrw-stẖ), "Great of Praises" (wrt-ḥzwt), "King’s Wife, his beloved" (ḥmt-nisw mryt.f), "Companion of Horus, his beloved" (smrt-ḥrw-mryt.f), "Consort and Beloved of the Two Ladies" (smȝyt-mry-nbty), and "Companion of Horus" (tist-ḥrw). Khenut may have been mentioned in the mortuary temple of Unas. Her tomb, unlike that of Queen Nebet, has suffered extensive damage.
