= Ameny (queen) =

Ameny was an ancient Egyptian queen of the late Middle Kingdom, most likely dating to the 13th Dynasty, around 1750 to 1650 BC. She is only known from two scarabs. One of them is now in a private collection. The other one is in the Egyptian Museum of Berlin where she bears the simple title wife of a king. She is not yet known from any other object; therefore, her royal husband still remains unknown.
