= Nikaure =

Ancient Egyptian prince and vizier

- Vizier of Egypt
Egyptian name
r a n kA kA kAN(j) kꜣ.w Rꜥ
- Tenure: c. 2530 BC
- Burial: Giza, Giza Governorate, Egypt
- Spouse: Nikanebti
- Father: Possibly Khafre
- Mother: Persenet
- Children: Nikaure; Hetepheres; Ka-en-nebti-wer

Nikaure (fl. c. 2530 BC) was an ancient Egyptian prince and vizier during the 4th Dynasty, likely under Menkaure. His titles include king's eldest son of his body (sA-nswt n Xt=f), as well as chief justice and vizier (smsw tAjtj sAb TAtj).

== Family ==
Nikaure was a son of Queen Persenet and may have been a son of King Khafre. His wife was named Nikanebti. She was a priestess of Hathor, Mistress of the Sycamore in all her places.

In Nikaure's tomb, a will outlining his legacy is preserved. The will is dated to the "year of the twelfth occurrence of the numbering of large and small cattle (year 24 of Khafre). Nikaure leaves property to his wife Nikanebti, his son Nikaure, his daughter Hetepheres, and his son Ka-en-nebti-wer. The property that would have gone to a (presumably) deceased daughter reverts to Nikaure's wife Nikanebti.

== Tomb ==
Nikaure's tomb is LG 87 in Giza using the numbering introduced by Karl Lepsius. It is also given the designation G 8158, and is located in the Central Field which is part of the Giza Necropolis.
