= Persenet =

Egyptian queen consort

Persenet in hieroglyphs
pr r hatching
pr-[..]
Per[..]
pr r O34 n t
pr-snt (reconstructed)
Persenet

Persenet (Personet, Per-sent) was an ancient Egyptian queen consort of the 4th Dynasty. She may have been a daughter of Pharaoh Khufu and a wife of Pharaoh Khafre. She is mainly known from her tomb at Giza (G 8156).

== Biography ==
Partial name of Persenet from her tomb in Giza

According to Grajetzki, Persenet's full set of titles was: great of sceptre (wr.t-ḥts), king's beloved wife (ḥm.t-nỉswt mrỉỉt=f) and king's daughter of his body (sat-niswt-nt-xtf). The position of her tomb suggests that she was the wife of king Khafre and possibly a daughter of Khufu. Persenet may be the mother of the vizier Nikaure.

== Tomb ==
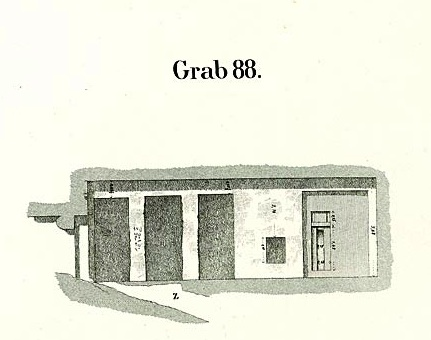
Cross section of the tomb of queen Persenet. (Lepsius)

Persenet's tomb is LG 88 in Giza using the numbering introduced by Lepsius. It is also given the designation G 8156. The tomb is a rock-cut mastaba located in the Central Field which is part of the Giza Necropolis.

Persenet's tomb is adjacent to that of Nikaure and were probably constructed at the same time. Persenet's tomb can be entered through and entrance in the south wall or an entrance in the east wall which connects to the tomb of Nikaure. The chamber is L-shaped and contains two pillars. There are no decorations on the walls but the pillars are inscribed.
