= Nebsemi =

Egyptian queen consort

nb z mi i T14 B1
Nebsemi
in hieroglyphs
Era: New Kingdom
(1550–1069 BC)

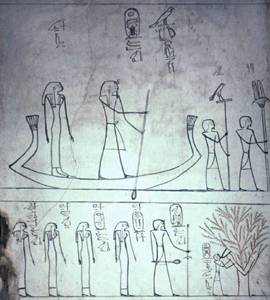
Thutmose III and his family from his tomb KV34. On the boat: Menkheperre Thutmose III and his mother Iset. Below: Thutmose (as a child) suckled by his mother Iset (represented as a tree). Behind this scene: Thutmose leads a procession of his family members: King's Wife Meritre-Hatshepsut; King's Wife Satiah, deceased; King's Wife Nebtu; King's Daughter Nefertari, deceased.

Nebsemi was an ancient Egyptian queen consort, a wife of Pharaoh Thutmose III of the 18th Dynasty.

A fragment of a granite statue of hers was found in Thutmose's Theban mortuary temple. It is about 80 cm high and 30 cm wide, and portrays the queen in a sitting position. Its style is reminiscent of 12th Dynasty statues, but since nothing else of that period was found in the temple, it was dated to the 18th dynasty. Nebsemi's name is not known from other sources, but judging from the statue's size she was an important person during the time when the temple was built. Her name is followed by the epithet maa kheru, "true of voice", indicating that she was already dead when the statue was made.

Her titles were: "King's Wife" (ḥmt-nỉswt), "King's Beloved Wife" (ḥmt-nỉswt mrỉỉ.t=f ).
