= Setibhor =

H D2 r st t ib

Queen consort of Egypt
- Burial: Saqqara, Egypt
- Spouse: Possibly Isesi
- Dynasty: 5th Dynasty of Egypt
- Religion: Ancient Egyptian religion

Setibhor was an ancient Egyptian queen consort from the end of the 5th Dynasty. She was most likely the wife of king Djedkare Isesi. She had several titles including Friend of Horus The one who sees Horus and Seth, the great one of the hetes sceptre, the great of praise and king’s wife, his beloved.

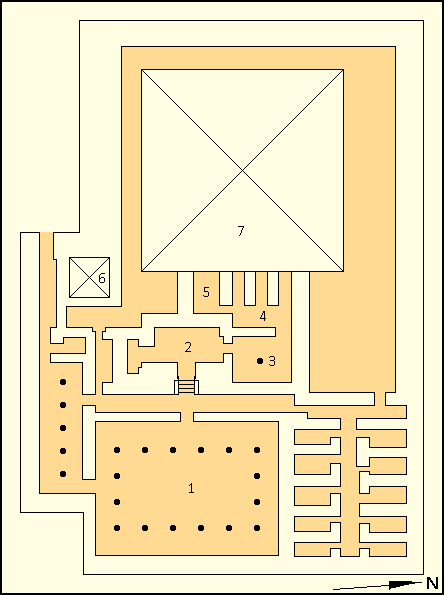
Layout of Setibhor's complex. In order: 1) Colonnaded courtyard; 2) Five niche statue chapel; 3) Antichambre carrée; 4) Storerooms; 5) Offering hall; 6) Cult pyramid; 7) Main pyramid.

Her pyramid was known for a long time, lying next to that of the king at Saqqara and is known for its unusually large size, the largest built for a Queen in the Old Kingdom. Her name and titles were found on a column in 2019. The pyramid incorporates elements that were previously only used in the complexes of the king.

Egyptian archeologist Ahmed Fakhry (1905–1973) excavated her mortuary temple in the 1950s, but the report was never published. American Egyptologist Klaus Baer (1930–1987), who assisted Fakhry on the excavation, noted that scenes had been "secondarily altered" with texts above the Queen's head erased and replaced by "vultures and other royal insignia". He also noted that the temple was "badly destroyed". Contemporary American Egyptologist Ann Macy Roth suggested that the royal insignia and the violence used on her monument indicate that she may have ruled as a female king, similar to how Hatshepsut's monuments were defaced after her death. More recent research after fuller excavation of the monument is more cautious, but still point to the high status of this woman. The decoration of her pyramid temple shows many features only attested for sure for later queens.
