= Nimaathap II =

Queen consort of Egypt

V28 Aa5 Q3 N35 U1 Aa11 X1
nj mꜣ't ḥp
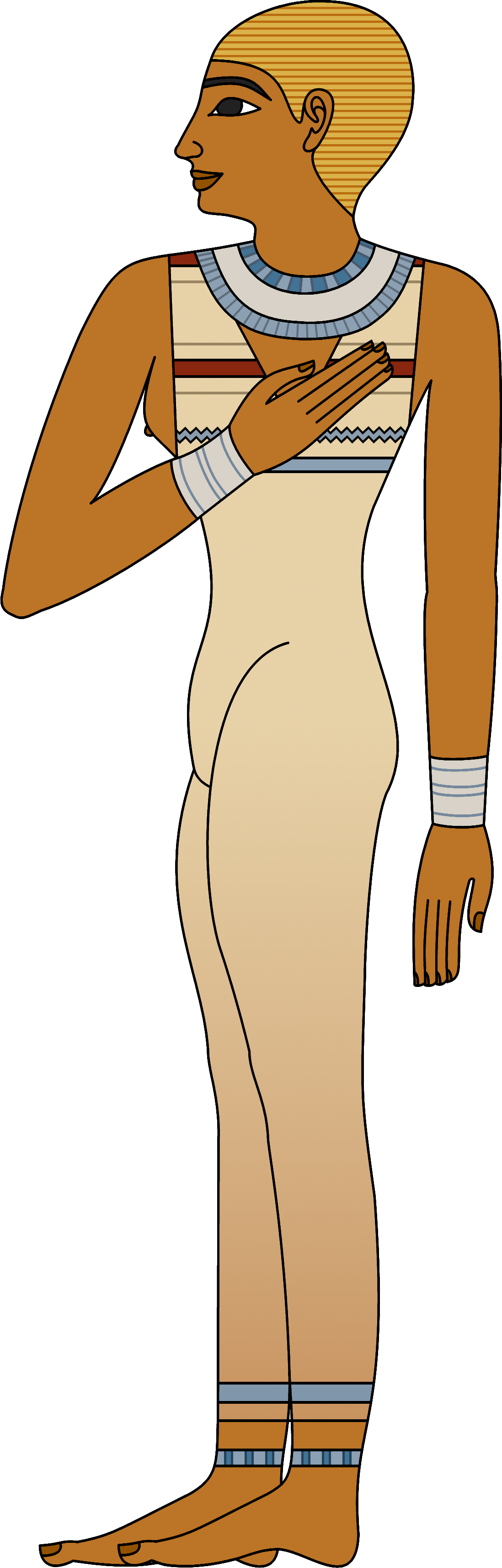
- An impression showing how Nimaathap II might have been represented in art, based on Old Kingdom iconography

Queen consort of Egypt
- Tenure: c. 2450 BC
- Burial: Badrshein, Giza, Egypt
- Dynasty: 5th Dynasty of Egypt
- Religion: Ancient Egyptian

Nimaathap II (also Nimaethap II; fl. c. 2450 BC) was an ancient Egyptian queen suggested to have lived during the first half of the Fifth Dynasty of the Old Kingdom of Egypt.

== Life ==
There remains very little evidence that records the existence of Nimaathap II. Egyptologist George Reisner variously attempted to link Nimaathap II's burial to the first half of the Fifth Dynasty and to the reigns of kings as late as Nyuserre Ini.

Egyptologist Lisa Kuchman Sabahhy aims to place Nimaathap II much earlier. She suggests parallels between the titles of Nimaathap II and a queen of the late Fourth Dynasty, Bunefer, and presents the two queens as contemporaries.

French Egyptologist Michel Baud notes that Reisner's categorisation of Nimaathap II's burial was motivated by an attempt to reconstruct the royal families of the late Fourth Dynasty. Nonetheless, Baud dates her to the first half of the Fifth Dynasty.

Peter Jánosi, in undertaking a critical analysis of the datation of Nimaathap II's burial, questions Reisner's conclusions, labelling them contradictory. He also dismisses Sabbahy's proposition, implying that it was made on uncertain assumptions. He observes that linking figures based on their titulary is not appropriate for all burials, pointing to the precedent that inscriptions are often added to or changed long after internment. He further highlights that the datation of Bunefer's burial is not settled fact.

Instead, Jánosi prefers to closely examine the structural remains of the surrounding cemetery, consequently concluding that Nimaathap II's burial can only have taken place at such time the Fifth Dynasty was already well underway.

== Titulary ==
Nimaathap II was a royal woman. The only titles preserved are she who sees Horus and Seth and great one of the Hetes-Sceptre. They are known from her burial. Egyptologist Wilfried Seipel shows that these titles are customary of royal women of the Old Kingdom.

== Family ==
Nimaathap II was identified with the titles that indicate that she was a royal wife, presumably to an unnamed king. It is highly likely therefore that she was a figure of royal stature, but to whom, it cannot be said.

There exists no known surviving record that attributes Nimaathap II her parentage or issue.

== Burial ==
Nimaathap II was buried in mastaba G 4712 in the Western Cemetery of Saqqara. It was first excavated by Reisner in late 1915 as part of a wider excavation of burials in the Western Cemetery. The findings were published in the History of the Giza Necropolis.

The mastabas consists of a cult chapel with a niche at one end and an underground structure in the form of a shaft. Jánosi notes the discovery of a weathered false door. Evidence of a smaller mastaba, G4712 a, whose condition has severely deteriorated, was also uncovered by Reisner, partly overbuilt by Nimaathap II's. This is a curious find that Jánosi felt inferred the cemetery was already crowded come the time of Nimaathap II. According to him, cramming the burial of such a high ranking figure into this cemetery defies explanation.

Issues which further complicate attempts to precisely date the burial are its location and construction. Jánosi assesses the mastaba to be one of only a handful of examples of a Saqqara tomb apparently lacking context to its surroundings. Further, from Reisner's categorisation, G 4712 can be said to have been constructed of the simplest and poorest materials.

In order to reconcile the peculiarities of Nimaathap II's burial, further research or substantial inscriptional evidence is needed. Jánosi goes so far as to acknowledge more fringe explanations, namely: that Nimaathap II fell into disgrace, or that her titles were false attestations, although he offers these theories little support.

== Attestations ==
Nimaathap II is known solely from an attribution on the false door of her mastaba. Its condition has deteriorated in antiquity, but epithets bestowed upon her during her life are legible.

== Bibliography ==
- Callender, Vivienne Gae (2010). In Hathor’s Image I, The Wives and Mothers of Egyptian Kings from Dynasties I-VI. Prague: Czech Institute of Egyptology.
- Jánosi, Peter (1992). "The Queens of the Old Kingdom and their Tombs". Bulletin of the Australian Centre for Egyptology. Vol. 3. pp. 51–57.
