= Two Ladies =

Ancient Egyptian deities

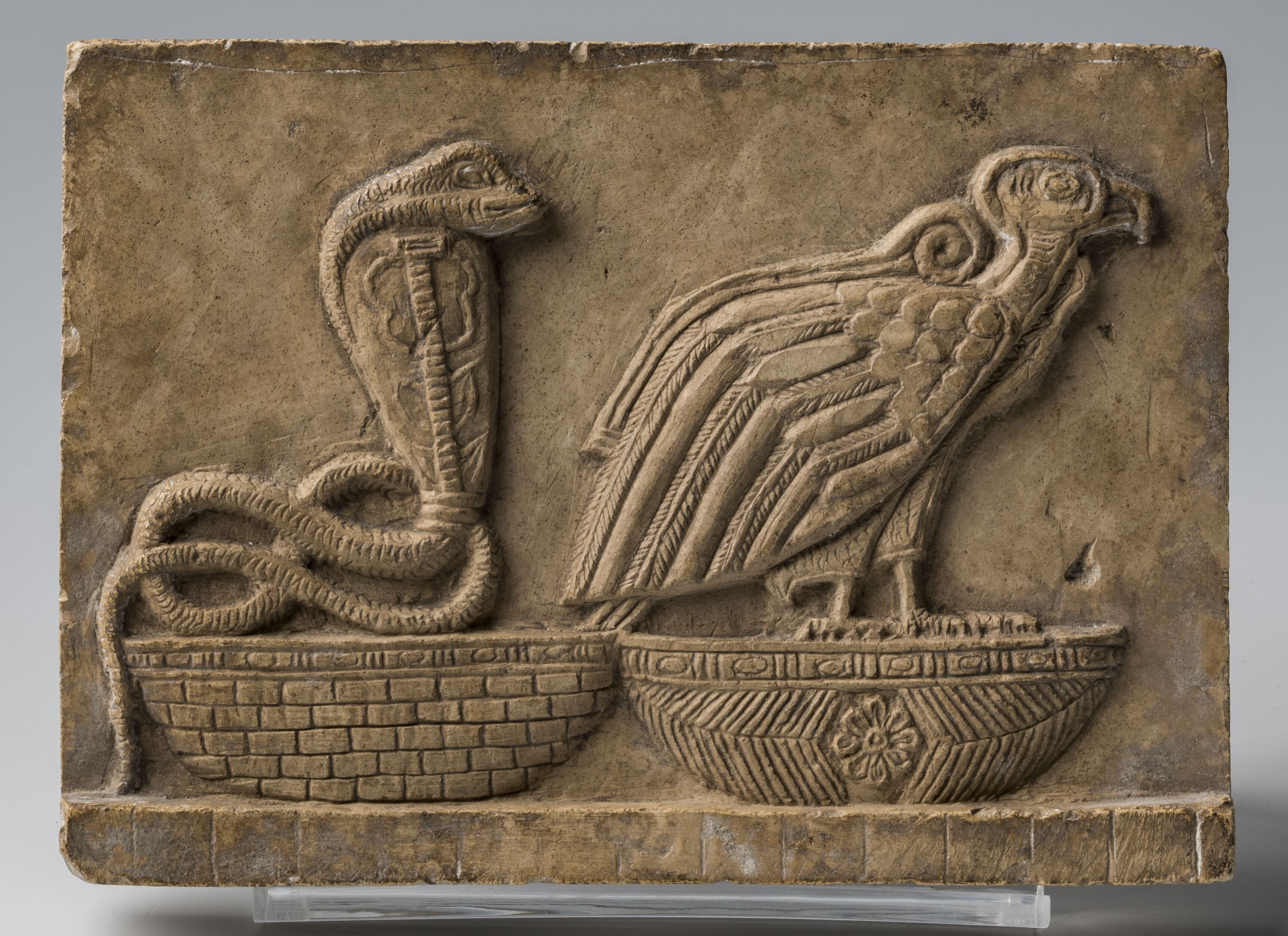
Animorphic representation of the Two Ladies (sculptor's model of hieroglyph of the royal title, limestone, between 332 and 30 BC. Museo Egizio, Turin)

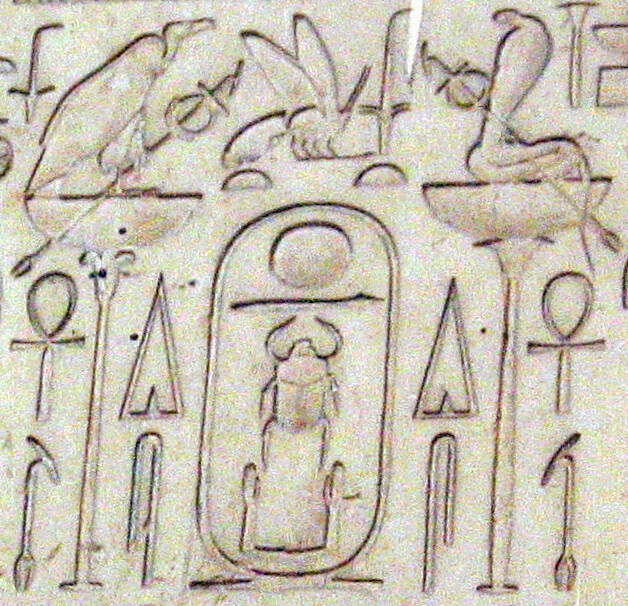
on stela of Tuthmosis I

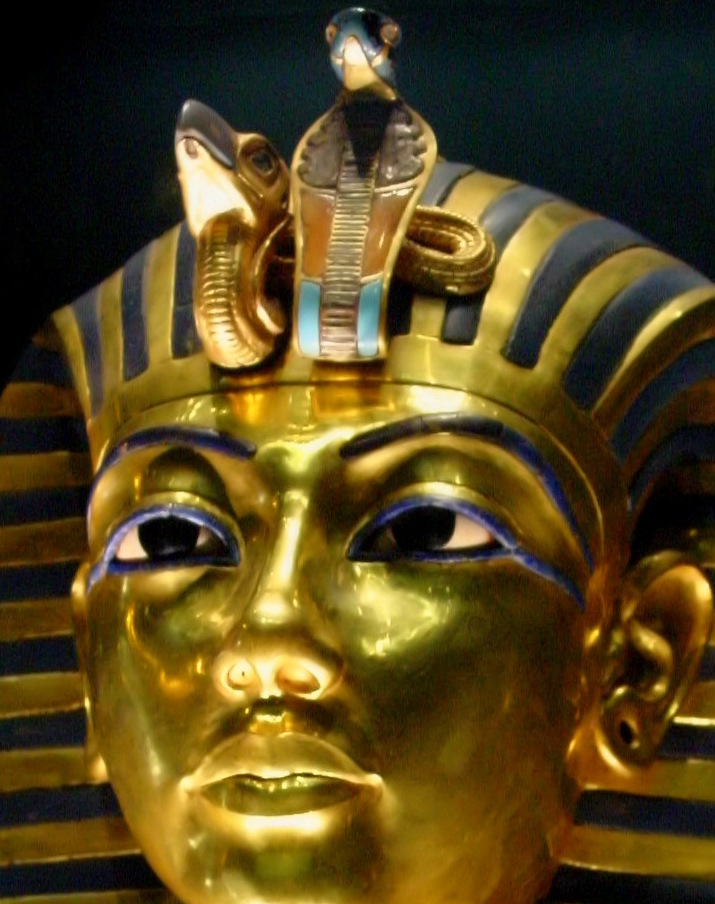
Combined uraeus

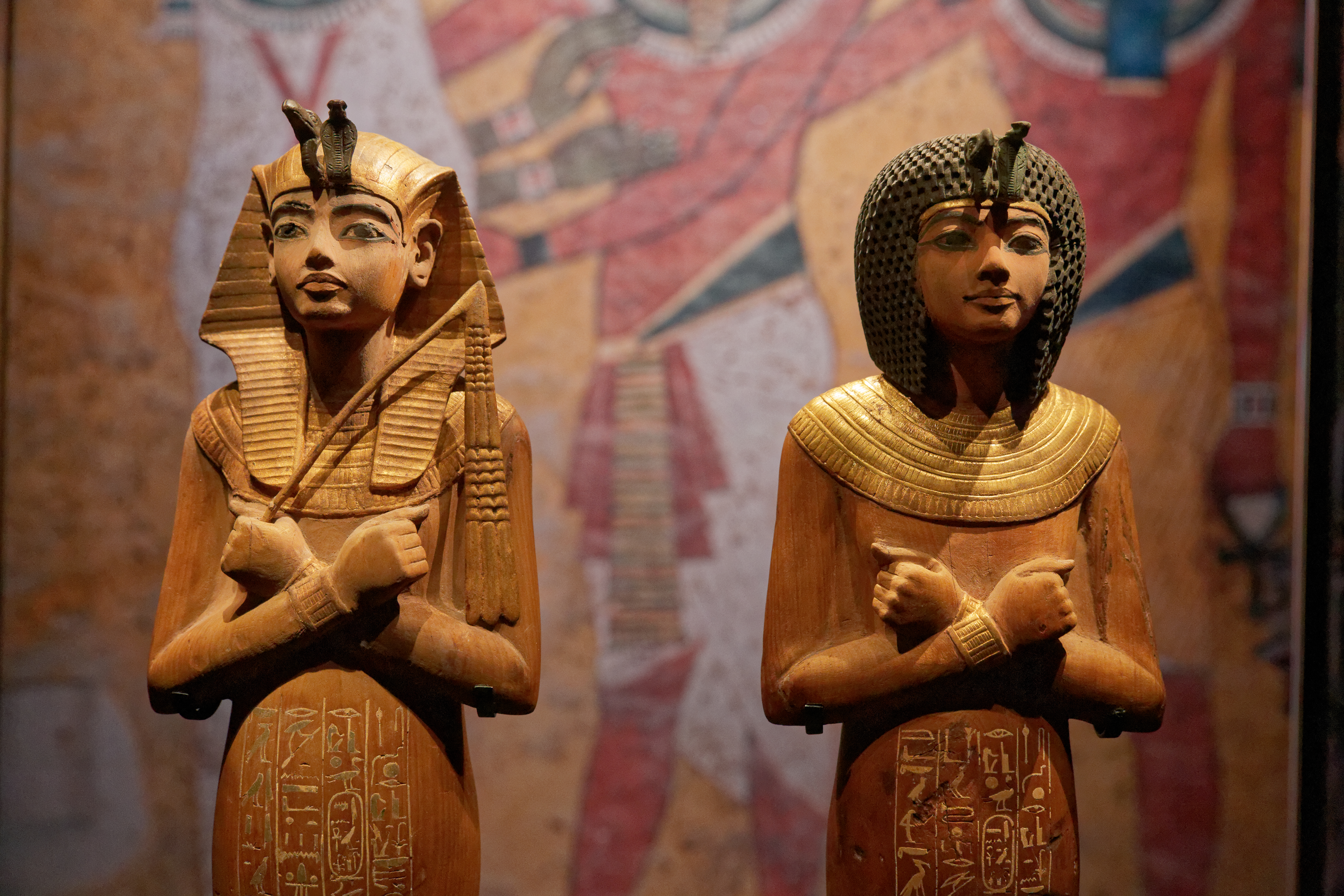
Combined uraeus

In Ancient Egyptian texts, the "Two Ladies" (Ancient Egyptian: nbtj, sometimes anglicized Nebty) was a religious epithet for the goddesses Wadjet and Nekhbet, two deities who were patrons of the ancient Egyptians and worshiped by all after the unification of its two parts, Lower Egypt, and Upper Egypt. When the two parts of Egypt were joined together, there was no merger of these deities as often occurred with similar deities from various regions and cities. Both goddesses were retained because of the importance of their roles and they became known as the Two Ladies, who were the protectors of unified Egypt.

After the unification, the image of Nekhbet joined Wadjet on the uraeus, thereafter, they were shown together as part of the crowns of Egypt. The Two Ladies were responsible for establishing the laws, protecting the rulers and the Egyptian countryside, and promoting peace.

== Usage in epithets ==
The holiest of deities in the Egyptian pantheon usually were referred to by epithets or other titles—sometimes in great chains of titles—in order to keep their names secret from enemies and disbelievers and to show respect for their powers.

An example of the use of this term in text references may be found in the following commemoration of a military campaign under pharaoh Amenhotep III recorded on three stelas carved from rock. In the text he is referred to as Nebmaatra. They are from his fifth year and were found near Aswan and Sai Island in Nubia. The official account of his military victory emphasizes his martial prowess with the typical hyperbole used by all pharaohs, but notes that the Two Ladies appeared to him to provide advice and a warning about the leader of the Kush army.

Regnal Year 5, third month of Inundation, day 2. ...appearing in truth, [the] Two Ladies, Who [establish] laws and [pacify] the Two Lands... [to the] King of Upper and Lower Egypt, Nebmaatra, heir of Ra, Son of Ra, [Amenhotep, ruler of Thebes]... came to tell [the pharaoh], "The fallen one of vile Kush has plotted rebellion in his heart." [The pharaoh] led on to victory; he completed it in his first campaign of victory. [The pharaoh] reached them like the wing stroke of a falcon... Ikheny, the boaster in the midst of the army, did not know the lion that was before him. Nebmaatra was the fierce-eyed lion whose claws seized vile Kush, who trampled down all its chiefs in their valleys, they being cast down in their blood, one on top of the other

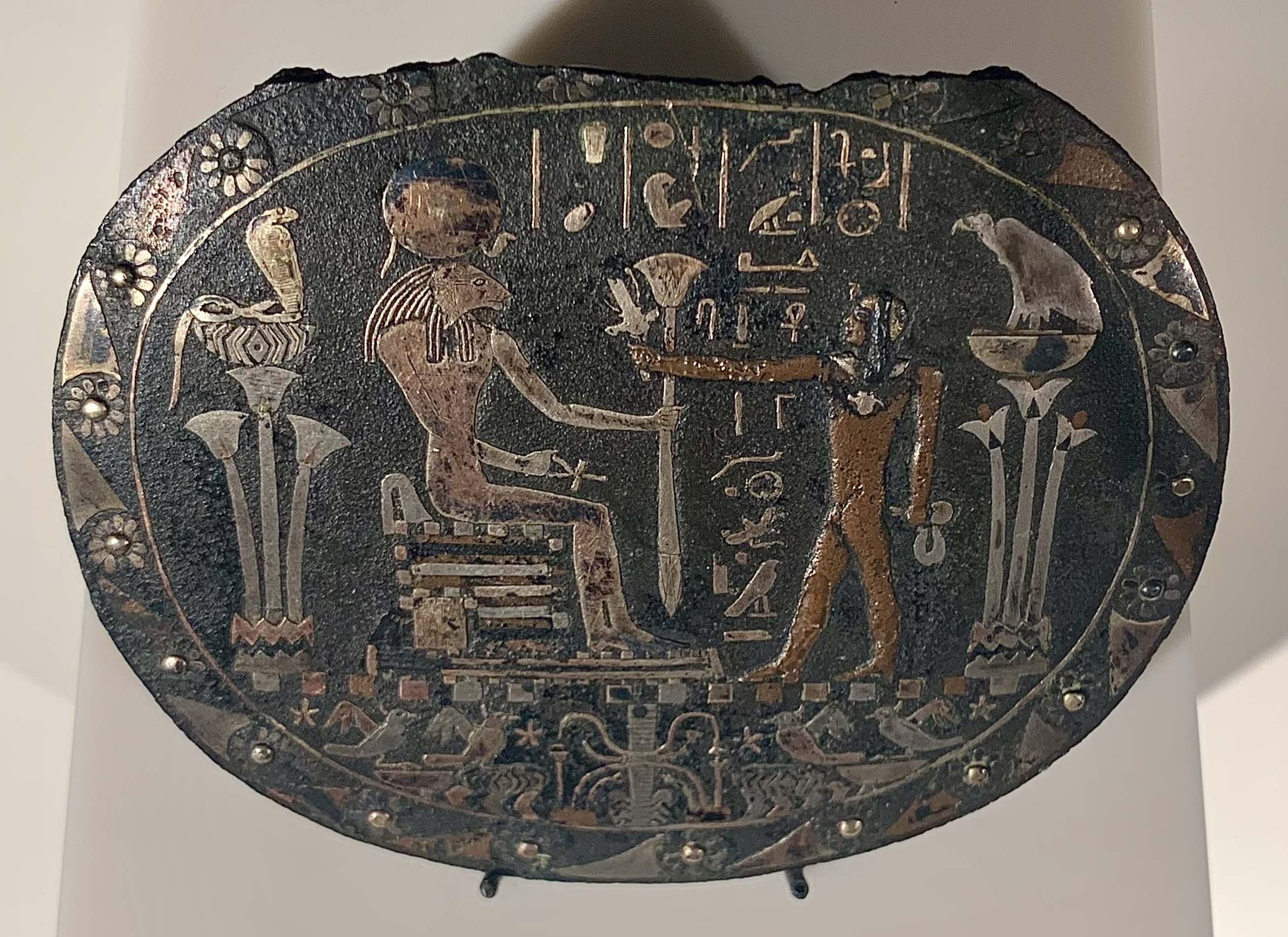
Image from a ritual Menat necklace, depicting a ritual being performed before a statue of Sekhmet on her throne where she is flanked by the goddess Wadjet as the cobra and the goddess Nekhbet as the griffon vulture, symbols of lower and upper Egypt respectively; the supplicant holds a complete menat and a sistrum for the ritual, circa 870 B.C. (Berlin, Altes Museum, catalogue number 23733)

The references about fierce-eyed lions is another epithet, related to the war deity, Sekhmet, the fierce warrior goddess of Egypt who protected the pharaoh in battle, conquered his enemies, and brought victory. She was depicted as a lioness and the pharaoh-as-warrior was said to be her son, therefore, a lion. Bast was her counterpart in one of the two lands, but after unification, Sekhmet remained as the fierce warrior and Bast was assigned other duties in the Egyptian pantheon.

These three deities were the strongest patrons of Ancient Egypt. They never were displaced by deities who rose and declined in importance to the Egyptians when the pharaohs chose a special personal patron, a temple became extremely powerful, or the capitals changed. The use of the image of the two patron goddesses on the crown (or headdress in general) was retained even during the rule of Akhenaten, who may have suppressed the worship of deities other than his own personally chosen favorite, Aten. His Hebty, or Nebty name was derived from a root with the Two Ladies as well, as seen in the hieroglyphic image of Akhenaten's Hebty name, Wernesytemakhetaten, displayed in the information box at his article and should be translated as, He of the Two Ladies, Great of kingship in Akhetaten. In this way he differed from no other pharaoh and the importance of these traditional deities persisted subtly throughout his reign, when he tried to break the power of the temple of Amun. As soon as his reign ended, the ancient religious traditions were restored fully and even, later embraced by the subsequent foreign rulers of Egypt until the collapse of the Roman Empire.

On the central portion of the Menat necklace displayed above, the Two Ladies flank a statue of Sekhmet, who is being propitiated by the pharaoh in a temple ceremony. The placement of them alongside her in the temple of the lioness goddess, demonstrates the authority with which she always was associated, and the importance of an association with the Two Ladies.

== Nebty name ==
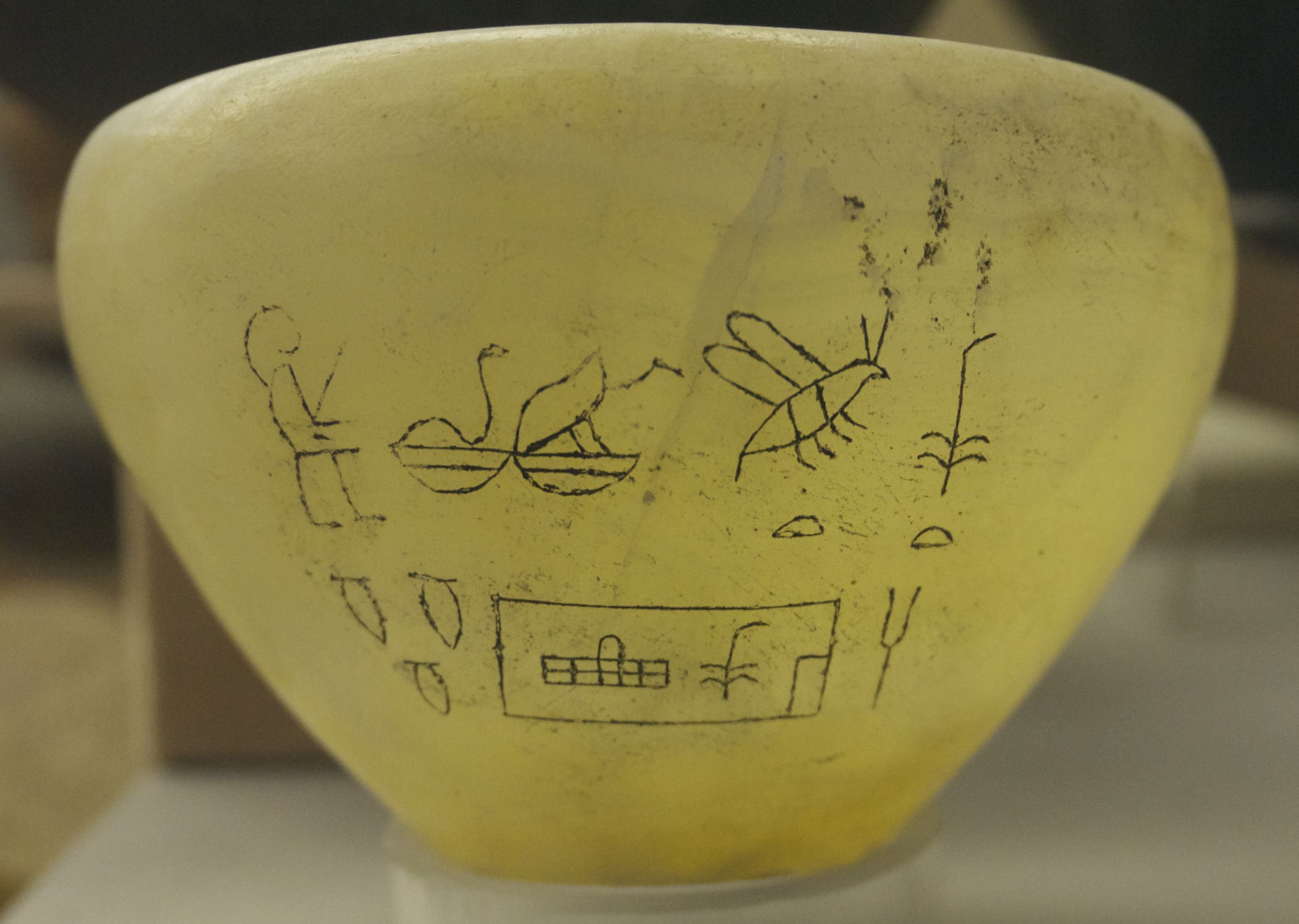
Alabaster vase inscribed with the Nebty-name of Semerkhet, the earliest known pharaoh to use this name

G16

The nebty name, literally meaning "Two Ladies", is one of the titles of an Egyptian pharaoh, following the standard naming convention used by the Ancient Egyptians. The name was associated with the patron goddesses of Upper and Lower Egypt:

- Nekhbet, patron deity of Upper Egypt, was represented as a griffon vulture, and
- Wadjet, patron deity of Lower Egypt, was represented as an Egyptian cobra.

The first time the nebty name is used definitively, is approximately 2920 BC by the First Dynasty pharaoh, Semerkhet, although the name only became a fully independent title by the Twelfth Dynasty which began in 1991 BC.

Typically, this name is not framed by a cartouche or serekh, but always begins with the hieroglyphs of a vulture and a cobra, each resting upon a basket, symbolizing the dual noun nebty. The rest of the title varies with each pharaoh, and would have been read, he/she of the Two Ladies, followed by the meaning of the rest of the title. Translation of the nebty name for a pharaoh often is abbreviated, omitting the phrase above that begins each nebty name, making full understanding of the title difficult.

== Anthropomorphic Ptolemaic representation ==
Temple of Horus at Edfu is a temple that was built on top of the ruins of an early temple during the Ptolemaic Dynasty between 237 BC to 57 BC—into the reign of Cleopatra VII, who was the last ruling pharaoh before Egypt was absorbed into the Roman Empire.

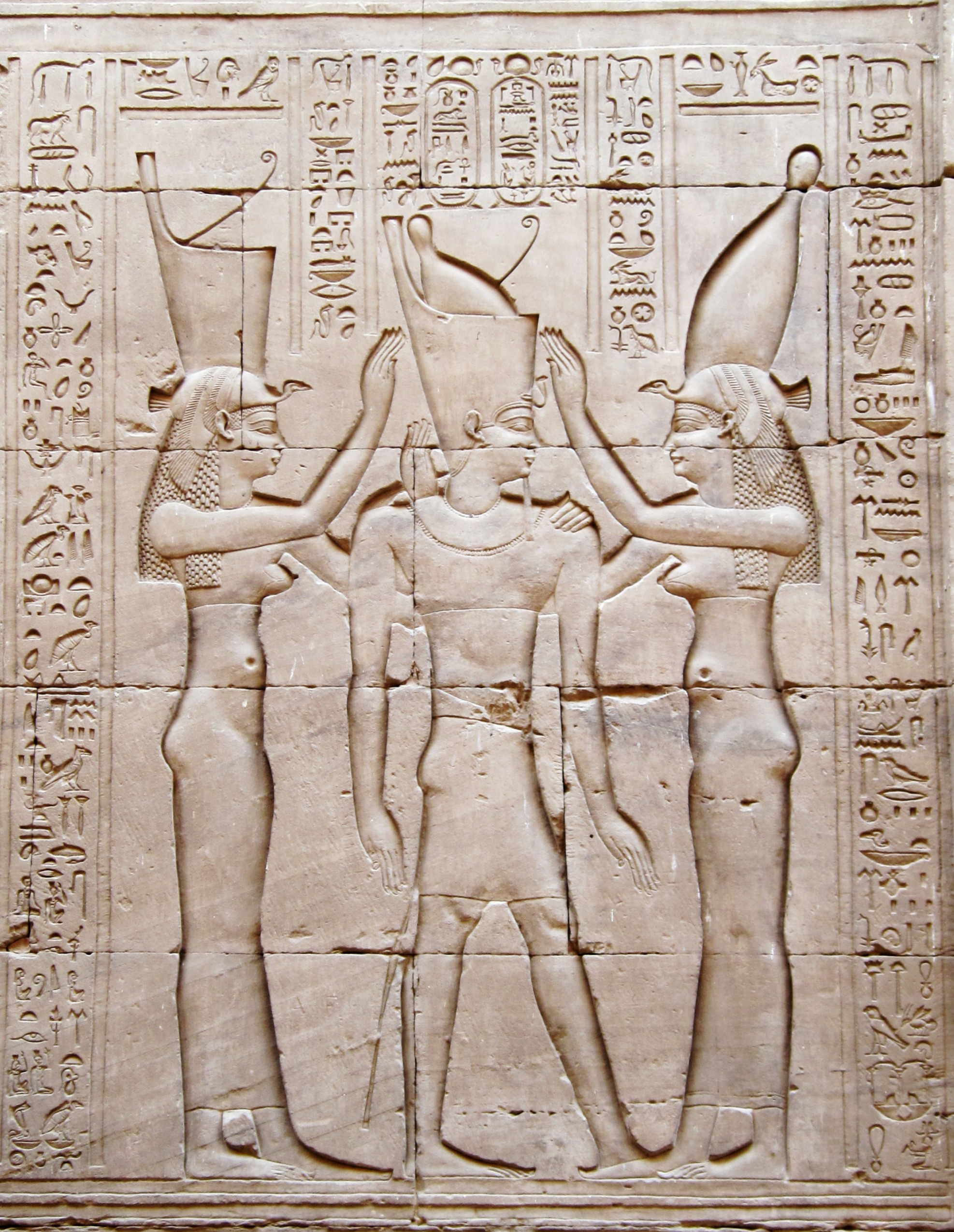
At the Ptolemaic temple at Edfu a relief shows the Two Ladies crowning a pharaoh

In the relief on the temple, the two goddesses are shown crowning a Ptolemaic pharaoh with the double crown derived from the combination of their separate crowns. The Two Ladies are represented wholly as women, in the same way as some other Ancient Egyptian goddesses, without any of the zoomorphic details that were characteristic of the traditional Ancient Egyptian imagery.

The headdresses of the goddesses in the relief imagery also are inconsistent with traditions. A vulture is displayed as the base of both headdresses. The vulture never was related to both, only to Nekhbet, and the cobra representing Wadjet is missing from what is represented as her headdress. This tiny detail is a subtle indicator of the lack of understanding of the ancient cultural traditions by foreign rulers who, nonetheless, preferred to be seen as a cultural continuation.

These Greek rulers embraced the Ancient Egyptian traditions, albeit with their own differing interpretations and styles and, at times introducing concepts that the Ancient Egyptians would not have represented, that were based upon parallels made to their Greek traditions and concepts. Greek and Roman religious beliefs were significantly less zoomorphic than those of Ancient Egyptians. In indigenous Egyptian traditions, these goddesses might have been portrayed as women with the heads of the respective animals more typically representing the deities when not represented as only the animals associated with them.
