= Fifth Dynasty of Egypt =

Dynasty of ancient Egypt (Old Kingdom)

- c. 2498 BC–c. 2345 BC
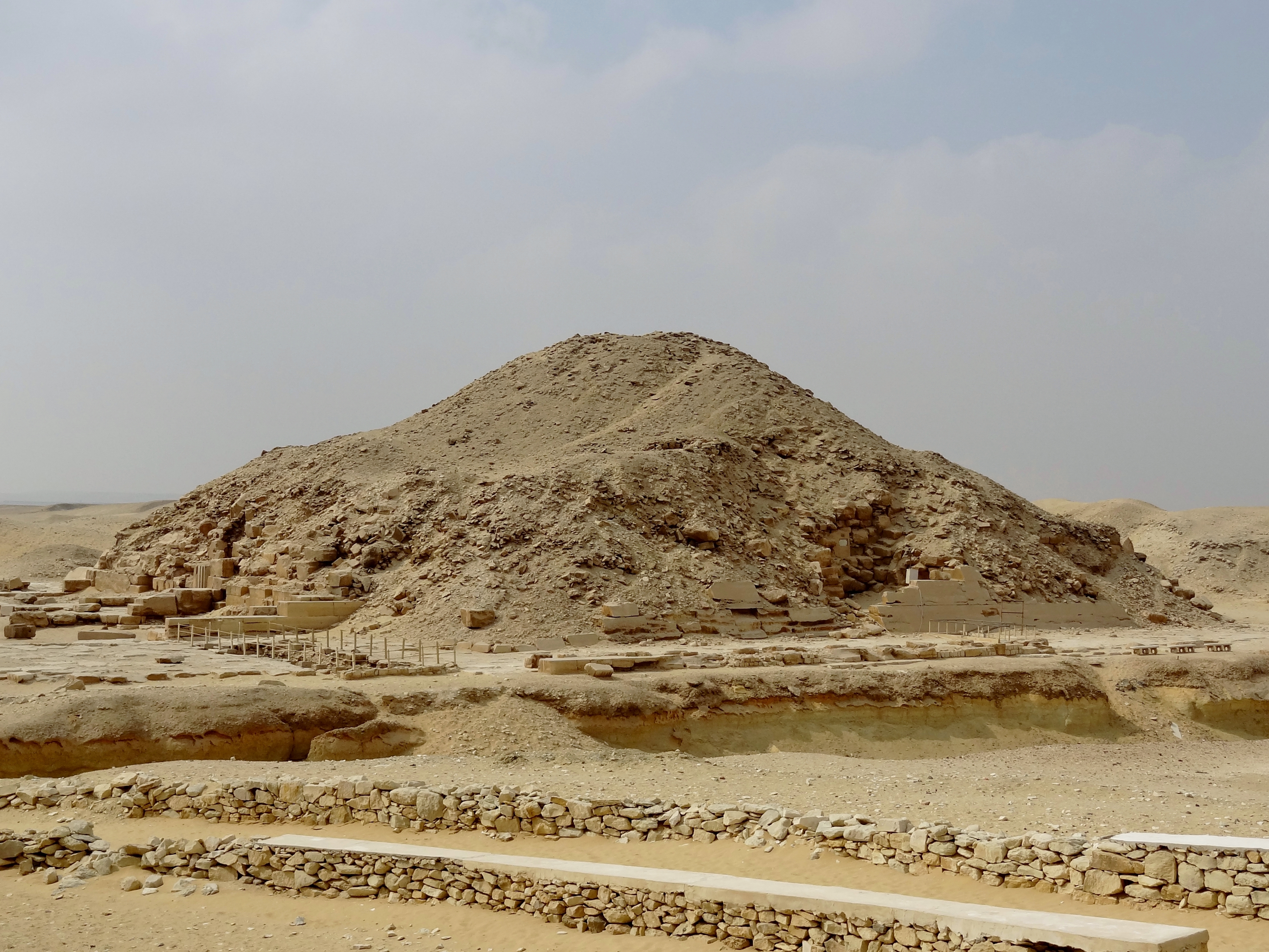
- The pyramid of Unas at Saqqara
- Capital: Memphis
- Common languages: Egyptian language
- Religion: ancient Egyptian religion
- Government: Absolute monarchy
- Monarch
  - c. 2498–c. 2491 BC (first): Userkaf
  - c. 2375–c. 2345 BC (last): Unas
- Historical era: Old Kingdom of Egypt
  - Established: c. 2498 BC
  - Disestablished: c. 2345 BC
Preceded by	Succeeded by
Fourth Dynasty of Egypt	Sixth Dynasty of Egypt

The Fifth Dynasty of ancient Egypt (notated Dynasty V) is often combined with Dynasties III, IV and VI under the group title the Old Kingdom. The Fifth Dynasty pharaohs reigned for around 150 years, from the early 25th century BC until the mid 24th century BC.

== Chronology ==
The Fifth Dynasty of Egypt is a group of nine kings ruling Egypt for around 150 years in the 25th and 24th centuries BC. (Note: Several dates have been proposed by the scholars for the Fifth Dynasty: 2513–2374, 2510–2370, 2510–2460, 2504–2345, 2498–2345, 2494–2345, 2465–2323, 2454–2297, 2450–2335, 2450–2325, 2435–2306, 2392–2282) The relative succession of kings is not entirely secured as there are contradictions between historical sources and archaeological evidence regarding the reign of the shadowy Shepseskare.

== Rulers ==
Known rulers in the Fifth Dynasty are listed below. Manetho assigns 248 years of rule to the Fifth Dynasty; however, the pharaohs of this dynasty more probably ruled for around 150 years. This estimate varies by both scholar and source. The Horus names and most names of the queens are taken from Dodson and Hilton.

Dynasty V monarchs
Nomen (personal name)	Prenomen (throne name)	Horus-name	Image	Reign	Pyramid	Spouse(s)
Userkaf		Irimaat		c. 2498 – c. 2491 BC	Pyramid of Userkaf	
Sahure		Nebkhau		c. 2491 – c. 2477 BC	Pyramid of Sahure	Meretnebty
Kakai	Neferirkare	Userkhau		c. 2477 – c. 2460 BC	Pyramid of Neferirkare	Khentkaus II
Isi	Neferefre	Neferkhau		c. 2460 – c. 2458 BC	Unfinished Pyramid of Neferefre	
Netjeruser	Shepseskare	Sekhemkhau		Around a few months, c. 2458 BC		
Ini	Nyuserre	Setibtawy		c. 2458 - c. 2422 BC	Pyramid of Nyuserre Ini	Reptynub
Kaiu	Menkauhor	Menkhau		c. 2422 - c. 2414 BC		
Isesi	Djedkare	Djedkhau		c. 2414 - c. 2375 BC	Pyramid of Djedkare Isesi	
Unas		Wadjtawy		c. 2375 - c. 2345 BC	Pyramid of Unas	Nebet; Khenut

Manetho writes that the Dynasty V kings ruled from Elephantine, but archeologists have found evidence clearly showing that their palaces were still located at Ineb-hedj ("White Walls").

As before, expeditions were sent to Wadi Maghareh and Wadi Kharit in the Sinai to mine for turquoise and copper, and to quarries northwest of Abu Simbel for gneiss. Trade expeditions were sent south to Punt to obtain malachite, myrrh, and electrum, and archeological finds at Byblos attest to diplomatic expeditions sent to that Phoenician city. Finds bearing the names of several Dynasty V kings at the site of Dorak, near the Sea of Marmara, may be evidence of trade but remain a mystery.

=== Family tree ===
Menkaure
Fourth Dynasty
Khentkaus I
Userkaf	Neferhetepes
Sahure	Meretnebty
Shepseskare (Note: Alternatively Shepseskare may be the son of Neferirkare Kakai or Neferefre)	Neferirkare Kakai	Khentkaus II
Khentkaus III	Neferefre	Nyuserre Ini	Reptynub
Sheretnebty	Khamerernebty	Ptahshepses
Khuit I (Note: Alternatively Khuit I may be the wife of Unas)	Menkauhor Kaiu	Meresankh IV (Note: Meresankh IV has been could be the wife of a number of different 5th dynasty king)
Setibhor	Djedkare Isesi	Raemka
Nebet	Unas	Khenut	Neserkauhor	Meret-Isesi	Kaemtjenent
Kekheretnebti	Hedjetnebu	Isesi-ankh
Sixth Dynasty
Teti	Iput

=== Userkaf ===
How Pharaoh Userkaf founded this dynasty is not known for certain. The Westcar Papyrus, which was written during the Middle Kingdom, tells a story of how king Khufu of Dynasty IV was given a prophecy that triplets born to the wife of the priest of Ra in Sakhbu would overthrow him and his heirs, and how he attempted to put these children – named Userkaf, Sahure, and Neferirkare – to death; however in recent years, scholars have recognized this story to be at best a legend and admit their ignorance over how the transition from one dynasty to another transpired.

During this dynasty, Egyptian religion made several important changes. The earliest known copies of funerary prayers inscribed on royal tombs (known as the Pyramid Texts) appear. The cult of the god Ra gains added importance, and kings from Userkaf through Menkauhor Kaiu built temples dedicated to Ra at or near Abusir. Then late in this dynasty, the cult of the deity Osiris assumes importance, most notably in the inscriptions found in the tomb of Unas.

=== Djedkare Isesi ===
Amongst non-royal Egyptians of this time, Ptahhotep, vizier to Djedkare Isesi, won fame for his wisdom; The Maxims of Ptahhotep was ascribed to him by its later copyists. Non-royal tombs were also decorated with inscriptions, like the royal ones, but instead of prayers or incantations, biographies of the deceased were written on the walls.

== Comparison of regnal lists ==
The ancient kings lists are in broad agreement on the order of the kings of this dynasty, though some kings were omitted on certain lists. The Turin King List is today in a fragmentary state and names and reign lengths are missing for some parts of this dynasty. While Shepseskare's reign is placed before Neferefre on these lists, Egyptologists today believe he reigned briefly after Neferefre rather than before him.

Historical Pharaoh	Abydos King List	Saqqara Tablet	Turin King List	Manetho	Reign Years	
Historical Pharaoh	Abydos King List	Saqqara Tablet	Turin King List	Manetho	Turin List	Manetho
Userkaf	Userkaf	Userkaf	[User]kaf	Ouserkheres	7	28
Sahure	Sahure	Sahure	Name lost	Sephres	12	13
Neferirkare Kakai	Kakai	Neferirkare	Name lost	Nepherkheres	Lost	20
Shepseskare	–	Shepseskare	Name lost	Sisires	7	7
Neferefre	Neferefre	Khaneferre	Name lost	Kheres	Lost	20
Nyuserre Ini	Nyuserre	–	Name lost	Rhathoures	10+	44
Menkauhor Kaiu	Menkauhor	Menkauhor	Menkauhor	Menkheres	8	9
Djedkare Isesi	Djedkare	Maatkare	Djedu	Tankheres	28	44
Unas	Unis	Unis	Unis	Onnos	30	33

== Bibliography ==
- Allen, James; Allen, Susan; Anderson, Julie; Arnold, Arnold; Arnold, Dorothea; Cherpion, Nadine; David, Élisabeth; Grimal, Nicolas; Grzymski, Krzysztof; Hawass, Zahi; Hill, Marsha; Jánosi, Peter; Labée-Toutée, Sophie; Labrousse, Audran; Lauer, Jean-Phillippe; Leclant, Jean; Der Manuelian, Peter; Millet, N. B.; Oppenheim, Adela; Craig Patch, Diana; Pischikova, Elena; Rigault, Patricia; Roehrig, Catharine H.; Wildung, Dietrich; Ziegler, Christiane (1999). Egyptian Art in the Age of the Pyramids. New York: The Metropolitan Museum of Art. OCLC 41431623.
- Altenmüller, Hartwig (2001). "Old Kingdom: Fifth Dynasty". In Redford, Donald B. (ed.). The Oxford Encyclopedia of Ancient Egypt, Volume 2. Oxford: Oxford University Press. pp. 597–601. ISBN 978-0-19-510234-5.
- Arnold, Dieter (2003). The Encyclopaedia of Ancient Egyptian Architecture. London: I.B Tauris & Co Ltd. ISBN 1860644651.
- Bard, Kathryn, ed. (1999). Encyclopedia of the Archaeology of Ancient Egypt. London; New York: Routledge. ISBN 978-0-203-98283-9.
- Bárta, Miroslav (2017). "Radjedef to the Eighth Dynasty". UCLA Encyclopedia of Egyptology. 1 (1). San Diego: The University of California. ISBN 978-0-615-21403-0.
- Clayton, Peter (1994). Chronicle of the Pharaohs. New York: Thames & Hudson. ISBN 978-0-500-05074-3.
- Dodson, Aidan; Hilton, Dyan (2004). The Complete Royal Families of Ancient Egypt. London: Thames & Hudson. ISBN 978-0-500-05128-3.
- Grimal, Nicolas (1992). A History of Ancient Egypt. Translated by Ian Shaw. Oxford: Blackwell Publishing. ISBN 978-0-631-19396-8.
- Hornung, Erik; Krauss, Rolf; Warburton, David, eds. (2012). Ancient Egyptian Chronology. Handbook of Oriental Studies. Leiden, Boston: Brill. ISBN 978-90-04-11385-5. ISSN 0169-9423.
- Krauss, Rolf (1998). "Wenn und aber: Das Wag-Fest und die Chronologie des Alten Reiches". Göttinger Miszellen (in German). 162. Göttingen: Universität der Göttingen. Seminar für Agyptologie und Koptologie: 53–64. ISSN 0344-385X.
- Lehner, Mark (2008). The Complete Pyramids. London: Thames & Hudson Ltd. ISBN 978-0-500-05084-2.
- Málek, Jaromir (2000). "The Old Kingdom (c.2160-2055 BC)". In Shaw, Ian (ed.). The Oxford History of Ancient Egypt. Oxford University Press. pp. 83–107. ISBN 978-0-19-815034-3.
- Rice, Michael (1999). Who is who in Ancient Egypt. Routledge London & New York. ISBN 978-0-203-44328-6.
- Shaw, Ian, ed. (2000). The Oxford History of Ancient Egypt. Oxford: Oxford University Press. ISBN 0-19-815034-2.
- Verner, Miroslav (2001a). "Archaeological Remarks on the 4th and 5th Dynasty Chronology" (PDF). Archiv Orientální. 69 (3): 363–418. Archived from the original (PDF) on 2016-03-04.
- Verner, Miroslav (2001b). "Old Kingdom: An Overview". In Redford, Donald B. (ed.). The Oxford Encyclopedia of Ancient Egypt, Volume 2. Oxford: Oxford University Press. pp. 585–591. ISBN 978-0-19-510234-5.
- Verner, Miroslav (2001d). The Pyramids. The Mystery, Culture, and Science of Egypt's Great Monuments. Translated by Steven Rendall. New York: Grove Press. ISBN 978-0-8021-3935-1.
- von Beckerath, Jürgen (1997). Chronologie des pharaonischen Ägypten : die Zeitbestimmung der ägyptischen Geschichte von der Vorzeit bis 332 v. Chr. Münchner ägyptologische Studien (in German). Vol. 46. Mainz am Rhein: Philipp von Zabern. ISBN 978-3-8053-2310-9.

Preceded by Fourth Dynasty	Dynasty of Egypt c. 2498 BC – c. 2345 BC	Succeeded by Sixth Dynasty
