= Khamerernebty =

G16 xa mr D21 r
Khamerernebty
in hieroglyphs
Era: Old Kingdom
(2686–2181 BC)

Khamerernebty /ˌkʌˈmɪərˌʌˈnɛtiː/ (“The Beloved of the Two Ladies Appears”; “two ladies”, referring to the protective goddesses of Upper and Lower Egypt, was a title of the pharaoh) was an ancient Egyptian name, worn by two queens and a princess during the Old Kingdom:

- Khamerernebty I of the 4th dynasty was the wife of Pharaoh Khafra and the mother of Menkaura.
- Khamerernebty II, possible daughter of the former, was the wife of Menkaura.
- Princess Khamerernebty was the only known child of Pharaoh Niuserre of the 5th dynasty. She was married to the vizier Ptahshepses.
