= Reptynub =

Ancient Egyptian queen

- Spouse: King Nyuserre Ini
- Issue: Khamerernebty; Reputnebty; Khentykauhor
- Dynasty: Fifth Dynasty of Egypt

Reptynub (/rɛptiːnʊb/; also written as Repytnub and Reputnebu) was a queen during the Fifth Dynasty of Egypt. She was the wife of King Nyuserre Ini. She was possibly a mother of Menkauhor Kaiu (if he was Nyuserre’s son).

Reptynub is identified as the wife of Nyuserre based on the discovery of a fragment of a statue in his mortuary temple. A smaller pyramid next to that of Nyuserre likely belonged to his wife and the pyramid may have belonged to Reptynub.

Fragments of a statue of a queen were found in the tomb of the vizier Ptahshepses and his wife, the king’s daughter Khamerernebty. No name was found on the statue fragments, but the statue is assumed to depict Reptynub.

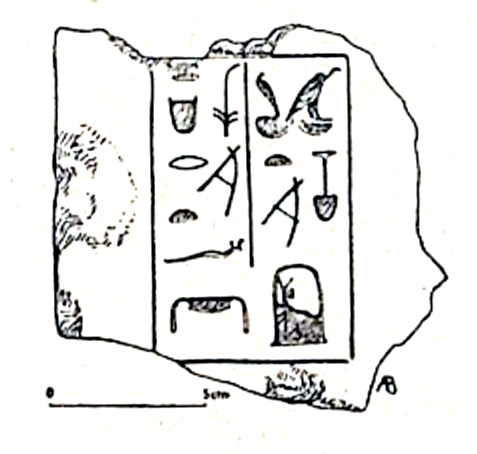
Fragment of a statue from the mortuary temple of the pyramid of Niuserre with the name of queen Reputnebu; Ägyptisches Museum Berlin

She could be a mother of the princess Reputnebty, who is mentioned on a limestone fragment found in the pyramid complex of the queen Khentkaus II. She was named after Two Ladies.

Another probable child of Reptynub was Prince Khentykauhor.

The father-in-law of Reptynub was King Neferirkare Kakai, and her brother-in-law was King Neferefre.

Preceded by Khentkaus II	Queen of Egypt; Fifth dynasty	Succeeded by Meresankh IV
