= Nyuserre Ini =

Ancient Egyptian pharaoh of the Fifth Dynasty

- Niuserre Ini, Neuserre Ini, Nyuserra, Newoserre Any, Rathoris
- Double statue portraying Nyuserre as both a young man and an old man, Museum of Egyptian Art in Munich

Pharaoh
- Reign: Around 36 years, c. 2458 - c. 2422 BC (Note: Proposed dates for Nyuserre's reign: 2474–2444 BCE, 2470–2444 BCE, 2465–2435 BCE, 2453–2422 BCE, 2453–2420 BCE, 2445–2421 BCE, 2445–2414 BCE, 2420–2389 BCE, 2402–2374 BCE, 2398–2388 BCE. In a 1978 work, the Egyptologist William C. Hayes credited Nyuserre with 30+2(?) years of reign, starting c. 2500 BCE.) (Note: The only date known reliably in relation with Nyuserre Ini comes from radiocarbon dating of a piece of wood discovered in the mastaba of Ptahshepses, a vizier and son in law of Nyuserre. The wood was dated to 2465–2333 BCE.)
- Predecessor: Shepseskare (most likely) or Neferefre
- Successor: Menkauhor Kaiu or Shepseskare (Nuzzolo)
Royal titulary
Horus name
Setibtawy
St jb tȝwj
Horus, The favourite (lit. place of the heart) of the two lands
G5	Q1 X1 F34 N16 N16
Nebty name
Nebtisetib
Nbti st ib
The favourite (lit. place of the heart) of the two Ladies
G16	Q1 X1 F34
Golden Horus
Bik Nebu Netjeri
Bjk-nbw-nṯr.j
The divine golden falcon
R8 G5 S12
Prenomen
Nyuserre
N.wsr Rˁ
Possessed of Ra's power
[He] who belongs to the power of Ra

M23 X1 L2 X1	ra n F12 s D21
Nomen
Ini
In.n j
Translation uncertain, possibly a nickname:
The delayed one (for an overdue baby)
The [one with bushy] eyebrows
G39 N5 < K1 n M17 >
Hieroglyphic variants:
< K1 n M17 M17 >
< K1 n >
- Consorts: Reptynub and at least 1 other spouse
- Children: Possibly Khamerernebty, Sheretnebty, Khentykauhor and/or 1 son
- Father: Neferirkare Kakai
- Mother: Khentkaus II
- Died: c. 2422 BC
- Burial: Pyramid of Nyuserre Ini, Giza, Egypt
- Monuments: Built ex-nihilo: Pyramid of Nyuserre Ini; Pyramid Lepsius XXIV; Lepsius XXV; Sun temple Shesepibre; Completed: Pyramid of Neferirkare Kakai; Pyramid of Neferefre; Pyramid complex of Khentkaus II; Sun temple of Userkaf; Renovated: Mortuary complex of Menkaure; Uncertain: Temple of Satet
- Dynasty: Fifth Dynasty

Nyuserre Ini (also Niuserre Ini or Neuserre Ini; in Greek known as Rathurês, Ῥαθούρης; died c. 2422 BC) was an Ancient Egyptian king, the sixth ruler of the Fifth Dynasty during the Old Kingdom period. He is credited with a reign of 24 to 36 years depending on the scholar, and likely lived in the second half of the 25th century BCE. Nyuserre was the younger son of Neferirkare Kakai and queen Khentkaus II, and the brother of the short-lived king Neferefre. He may have succeeded his brother directly, as indicated by much later historical sources. Alternatively, Shepseskare may have reigned between the two as advocated by Miroslav Verner, albeit only for a few weeks or months at the most. The relation of Shepseskare with Neferefre and Nyuserre remains highly uncertain. Nyuserre was in turn succeeded by Menkauhor Kaiu, who could have been his nephew and a son of Neferefre.

Nyuserre was the most prolific builder of his dynasty, having built three pyramids for himself and his queens and completed a further three for his father, mother and brother, all in the necropolis of Abusir. He built the largest surviving temple to the sun god Ra constructed during the Old Kingdom, named Shesepibre or "Joy of the heart of Ra". He also completed the Nekhenre, the Sun temple of Userkaf in Abu Gorab, and the valley temple of Menkaure in Giza. In doing so, he was the first king since Shepseskaf, last ruler of the Fourth Dynasty, to pay attention to the Giza necropolis, a move which may have been an attempt to legitimise his rule following the troubled times surrounding the unexpected death of his brother Neferefre.

There is little evidence for military action during Nyuserre's reign; the Egyptian state continued to maintain trade relations with Byblos on the Levantine coast and to send mining and quarrying expeditions to Sinai and Lower Nubia. Nyuserre's reign saw the growth of the administration, and the effective birth of the nomarchs, provincial governors who, for the first time, were sent to live in the provinces they administered rather than at the pharaoh's court.

As with other Old Kingdom pharaohs, Nyuserre benefited from a funerary cult established at his death. In Nyuserre's case, this official state-sponsored cult existed for centuries, surviving the chaotic First Intermediate Period and lasting until the Twelfth Dynasty of the Middle Kingdom. In parallel, a spontaneous popular cult appeared, with people venerating Nyuserre under his birth name "Iny". In this cult, Nyuserre played a role similar to that of a saint, being invoked as an intercessor between the believer and the gods. It left little archaeological evidence and seems to have continued until the New Kingdom, nearly 1,000 years after his death.

== Sources ==
=== Contemporaneous sources ===
Nyuserre Ini is well attested in sources contemporaneous with his reign, (Note: Numerous artefacts and architectural elements either bearing Nyuserre's nomen, prenomen or serekh or simply contemporary with his reign have been unearthed. These are now scattered throughout the world in many museums including the Boston Museum of Fine Arts, Brooklyn Museum, Los Angeles County Museum of Art, Metropolitan Museum of Art, Petrie Museum, the Egyptian Museum of Cairo and many more.) for example in the tombs of some of his contemporaries including Nyuserre's manicurists Khnumhotep and Niankhkhnum, the high officials Khufukhaf II, Ty, Rashepses, Neferefre-ankh and Khabawptah, and the priests of his funerary cult Nimaatsed and Kaemnefert.

=== Historical sources ===
Nyuserre is attested in three ancient Egyptian king lists, all dating to the New Kingdom. The earliest of these is the Karnak king list, which was commissioned by Thutmose III (fl. 1479–1425 BCE) to honour some of his forebears and which mentions Nyuserre in the fourth entry, which shows his birth name "Iny" in a cartouche. Nyuserre's prenomen occupies the 30th entry of the Abydos King List, written nearly 200 years later during the reign of Seti I (fl. 1290–1279 BCE). Nyuserre's prenomen was most likely also given on the Turin canon (third column, 22nd row), dating to the reign of Ramses II (fl. 1279–1213 BCE), but it has since been lost in a large lacuna affecting the document. Fragments of his reign length are still visible on the papyrus, indicating a reign of somewhere between 11 and 34 years. Nyuserre is the only Fifth Dynasty king absent from the Saqqara Tablet.

Nyuserre was also mentioned in the Aegyptiaca, a history of Egypt probably written in the 3rd century BCE during the reign of Ptolemy II (fl. 283–246 BCE) by the Egyptian priest Manetho. Even though no copies of the text survive, it is known through later writings by Sextus Julius Africanus and Eusebius. In particular, Africanus relates that the Aegyptiaca mentioned a pharaoh ´Ραθούρης, that is "Rathurês", reigning for forty-four years as the sixth king of the Fifth Dynasty. "Rathurês" is believed to be the Hellenised form of Nyuserre.

== Reign ==
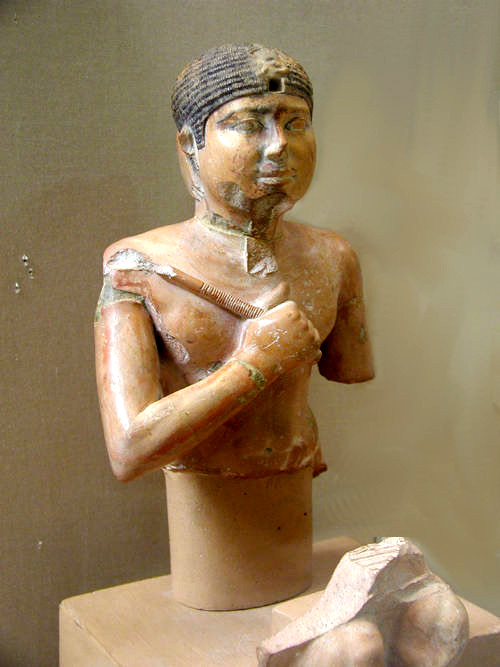
Neferefre, Nyuserre's elder brother, died unexpectedly in his early twenties after a short reign.

=== Accession to the throne ===
Two competing hypotheses exist in Egyptology to describe the succession of events running from the death of Neferirkare Kakai, the third king of the Fifth Dynasty, to the coronation of Nyuserre Ini, the sixth ruler of the dynasty. Relying on historical sources, where Nyuserre is said to have directly succeeded Neferefre, many Egyptologists such as Jürgen von Beckerath and Hartwig Altenmüller have traditionally believed that the following succession took place: Neferirkare Kakai → Shepseskare → Neferefre → Nyuserre Ini. In this scenario, Neferefre is the father of Nyuserre, who would have become pharaoh after Neferefre's unexpected death. Neferefre would be the successor of Shepseskare, credited with seven years of reign, as indicated in Manetho's Aegyptiaca.

This view was challenged, most notably by Miroslav Verner in 2000 and 2001, following excavations of the Abusir necropolis, which indicated that Neferefre's purported predecessor Shepseskare most likely reigned for only a few months between Neferefre and Nyuserre Ini. Verner proposes that the royal succession was Neferirkare Kakai → Neferefre → Shepseskare → Nyuserre Ini. In support of this hypothesis is Verner's observation that Neferefre and Nyuserre were very likely full brothers, both sons of Neferirkare Kakai, (Note: Neferefre was the eldest son of Neferirkare with queen Khentkaus II, as shown by a relief on limestone slab depicting Neferirkare and his wife Khentkaus with "the king's eldest son Ranefer", the future pharaoh Neferefre. At the same time, Nyuserre Ini undertook numerous construction works in the mortuary temple of Khentkaus II, who bore the title of "Mother of Two Kings of Upper and Lower Egypt", indicating that two of her sons ascended the throne. See below for a detailed discussion.) There is also evidence that Neferefre was Neferirkare's eldest son and in his early twenties at the death of his father, and thus would have been likely to inherit the throne. These observations, in addition to further archaeological evidence such as the lack of a pyramid of Shepseskare and the position of Neferefre's own, convinced Verner that Neferefre directly succeeded his father, dying after a very short reign of about two years.

Nyuserre was then still a child and, in this hypothesis, his claim to the throne faced a serious challenge in the person of his possible uncle Shepseskare who might have been a son of Sahure. Alternatively, Shepseskare may have been a short-lived son of Neferefre or, less likely, an usurper from outside the royal family. In any case, Shepseskare apparently succeeded in holding the crown for a short time. Nyuserre ultimately prevailed however, either because of Shepseskare's own premature death or because he was backed by powerful high officials and members of the royal family, foremost among whom were his mother Khentkaus II and Ptahshepses. This latter hypothesis is motivated by the exalted positions that both individuals seem to have enjoyed. The mortuary temple of Khentkaus II was designed to imitate that of a king, for example by incorporating its own satellite pyramid and having an alignment on an east–west axis. These features, together with Khentkaus II peculiar title of Mwt Nisw bity Nisw bity, originally translated by "Mother of the king of Upper and Lower Egypt [exercising office as] the king of Upper and Lower Egypt" led some scholars, including Verner, to propose that she might even have reigned in her own right. This hypothesis is now deemed unlikely, and her title is rather translated as "Mother of two kings of Upper and Lower Egypt". (Note: That is, Neferefre and Nyuserre Ini.) Ptahshepses became vizier under Nyuserre, whose daughter he married; received the honorary title of "King's son"; (Note: Verner proposes that he received the title upon marrying Nyuserre's daughter.) and was buried in one of the largest private tombs in Egypt. According to Verner and Nigel Strudwick, the architectural elements of this tomb such as its lotus-bud columns similar to those used in Nyuserre's own temple, boat pits and layout of the burial chamber, demonstrate "the favor shown by that king to his son-in-law".

=== Reign length ===
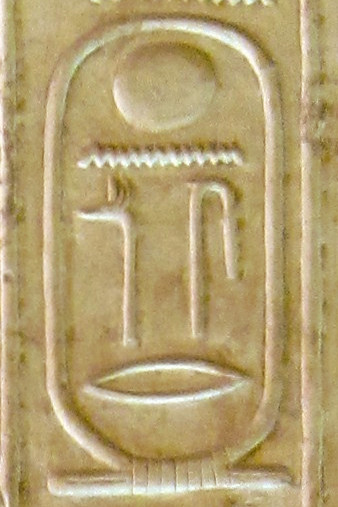
Cartouche of king Nyuserre Ini

==== Historical and archaeological evidence ====
Manetho's Aegyptiaca related that Nyuserre reigned for 44 years, a figure which is rejected by Egyptologists, who rather credit him with about three decades of reign owing to the paucity of secure dates for his rule. (Note: During the Old Kingdom, Ancient Egyptians did not have a system of absolute dating as we do today, rather they counted years from the beginning of a king's reign and gave them names relating to important events that occurred or would occur during this year. The most important such event was the cattle count, and many documents and inscriptions thus mentions the year of the Xth cattle count under king Y. In the case of Nyuserre, the latest such event attested in a document contemporaneous with his reign is the 8th cattle count, that is at most Nyuserre's 16th year on the throne.) The entry of the Turin canon pertaining to Nyuserre is damaged and the duration of his rule is difficult to read with certainty. Following Alan Gardiner's 1959 study of the canon, scholars such as Nigel Strudwick credited Nyuserre with 11 years of reign. (Note: Between his 1985 book on the Egyptian administration and his 2005 book on Egyptian texts of the Old Kingdom, Nigel Strudwick has changed his opinion on Nyuserre's reign length and now credits him with 31 years on the throne.) Gardiner's reading of the canon was then reevaluated from facsimiles, yielding a 24 to 25 years figure for Nyuserre's reign. This duration is accepted by some scholars including Nicolas Grimal. More recent analyses of the original papyrus conducted by Kim Ryholt have shown that Nyuserre's reign length as reported on the document could equally be 11–14, 21–24, or 31–34 years. (Note: Ryholt writes "Nyuserre's reign is damaged. There is a distinct trace of a 10, 20 or 30, followed by a stroke after which the papyrus breaks off. Accordingly, the possibilities are 11–14, 21–24, and 31–34 years [for Nyuserre], and not just 24 years" as is conventionally assumed.) The later figure is now favoured by Egyptologists including Strudwick and Verner.

The view that Nyuserre reigned in excess of twenty years is furthermore supported by archaeological evidence, which points to a fairly long reign for him. Verner, who has been excavating the Abusir necropolis on behalf of the University of Prague since 1976, points in particular to Nyuserre's numerous constructions, amounting to no less than three new pyramids, the completion of a further three, the construction of the largest sun temple built during the Old Kingdom.

==== Nyuserre's Sed festival ====
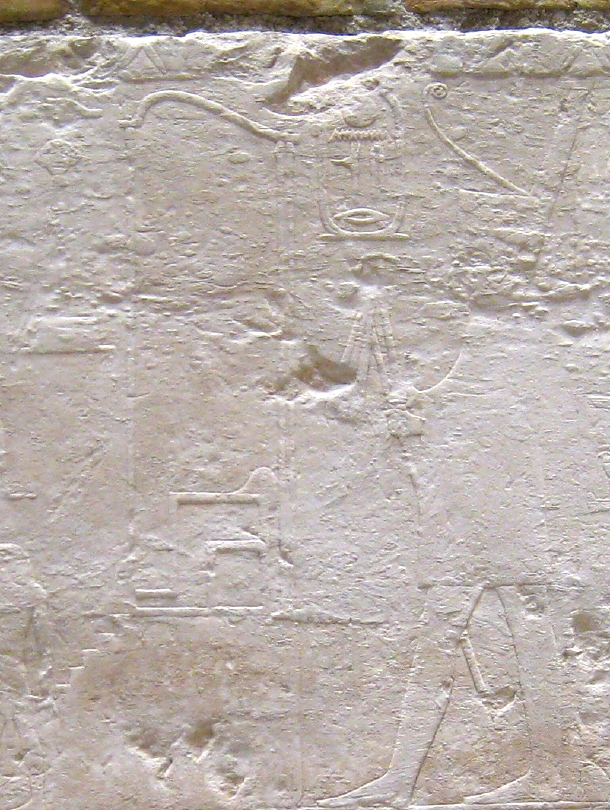
Relief of Nyuserre celebrating his Sed festival, Egyptian Museum of Berlin

The hypothesis of a reign more than three decades long for Nyuserre Ini is supported, albeit indirectly, by reliefs discovered in his solar temple showing him participating in a Sed festival. This festival was meant to rejuvenate the king and was normally (though not always) first celebrated after 30 years of rule. Representations of the festival were part of the typical decorations of temples associated to the king during the Old Kingdom and mere depictions of it do not necessarily imply a long reign. (Note: Verner writes that such scenes are part of a standard decoration program for the funerary complex of the king: "Beautiful reliefs with the scenes of the sed-festival from this sun temple are occasionally considered as indirect evidence of a long reign for this king. Generally, the historical authenticity [...] of such reliefs is doubted since the sed-festival scenes very probably belonged in the Old Kingdom to the standard 'Bildprogram' of the royal funerary monuments.) For example, a relief showing Sahure in the tunic of the Sed festival has been found in his mortuary temple, although both historical sources and archeological evidence agree that he ruled Egypt for less than 14 full years. Yet, in Nyuserre's case, these reliefs taken together with the archaeological evidence have convinced most Egyptologists that Nyuserre enjoyed over 30 years of reign and that "the sed-festival scenes from Abu Gurab [most probably reflect] the 30th jubilee of the king's accession to the throne".

The reliefs of Nyuserre's Sed festival offer a rare glimpse into the ritual acts carried out during this ceremony. In particular, the festival seems to have involved a procession in a barque over a body of water, a detail either not represented or lost in all subsequent representations of the festival until the reign of Amenhotep III (fl. c. 1390–1350 BCE), over 1,000 years after Nyuserre's lifetime.

=== Domestic activities ===
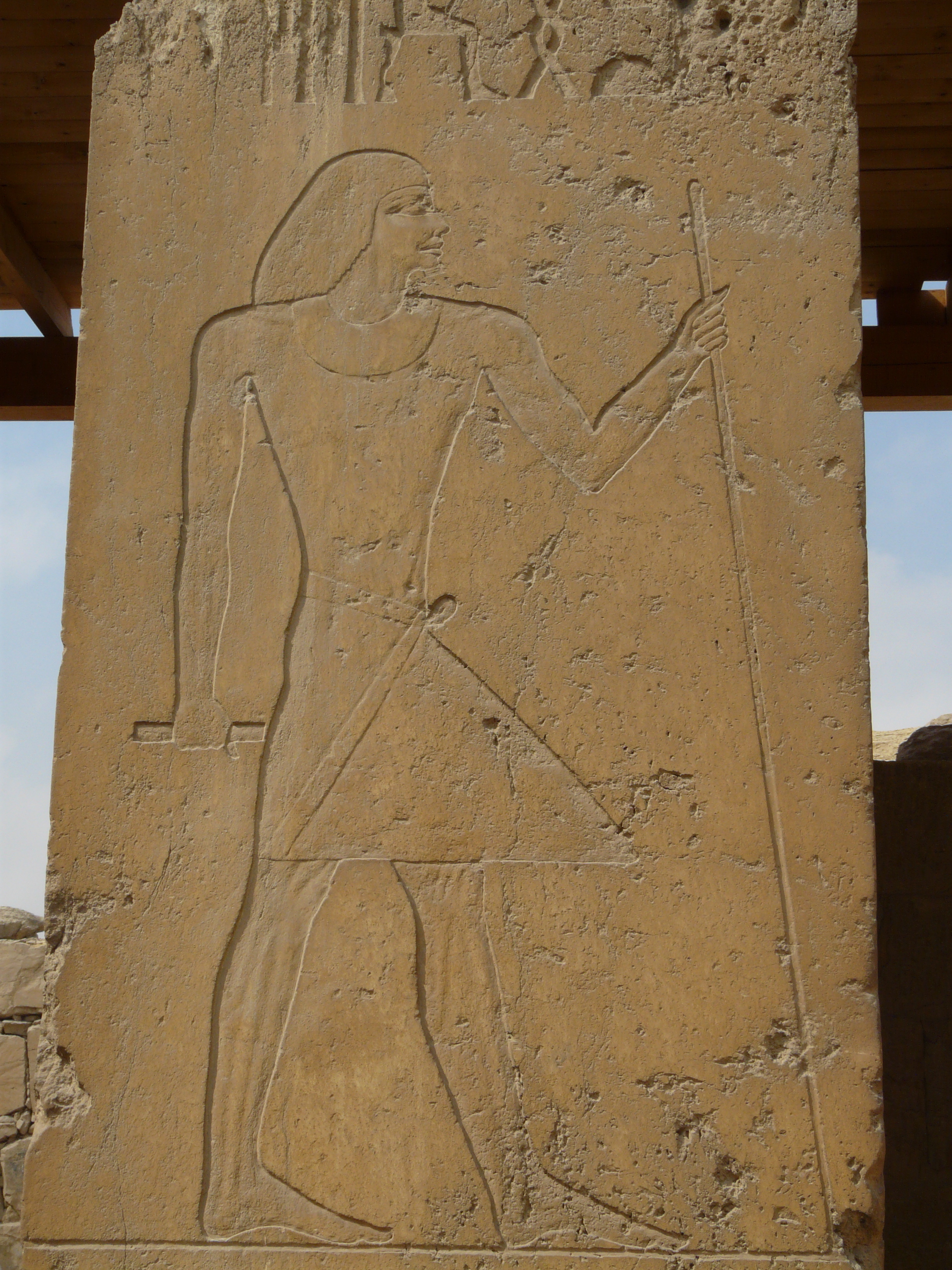
Ptahshepses, vizier and son in law of Nyuserre Ini

The reign of Nyuserre Ini witnessed the unabated growth of the priesthood and state bureaucracy, a phenomenon which had started in the early Fifth Dynasty in particular under Neferirkare Kakai. Changes in the Egyptian administration during this period are manifested by a multiplication in the number of titles, reflecting the creation of new administrative offices. These in turn, reflect a movement to better organise the administration of the state with the new titles corresponding to charges attached to very specific duties.

The king's power slowly weakened as the bureaucracy expanded, (Note: Joyce Tyldesley instead sees the reign of Djedkare Isesi as the very beginning of the decline in the importance of the king, given the decentralisation stemming from his reforms. Yet for Nigel Strudwick and Klaus Baer, these reforms were precisely undertaken as a reaction to the rapid growth of the central administration which had amassed too much political or economic power in the eyes of the king.) although he remained a living god in the eyes of his subjects.This situation went unchecked until the reign of Nyuserre's second successor Djedkare Isesi, who implemented the first comprehensive reforms of the system of ranking titles and thus of the administration.

There are two pieces of direct evidence of administrative activities during Nyuserre's reign. The first is that the Old Kingdom royal annals, of which only fragments survive, are believed to have been composed during his reign. The annals, which give details on the reigns of kings from the First Dynasty onwards on a year-by-year basis, are damaged and break off following the reign of Neferirkare Kakai. The second piece of evidence for administrative activity relates to the provincial administration. During the Old Kingdom, the Egyptian state was divided administratively into provinces, called nomes. These provinces were recognised as such since the time of Djoser, founder of the Third Dynasty, and probably harked back to the predynastic kingdoms of the Nile valley. The earliest topographical lists of the nomes of Upper and Lower Egypt date back to the reign of Nyuserre, a procession of personified nomes being depicted on reliefs from Nyuserre's sun temple. It is also around this time that the nomarchs started to reside in their province rather than at the royal residence.

=== Activities outside Egypt ===
==== Trade and mining expeditions ====
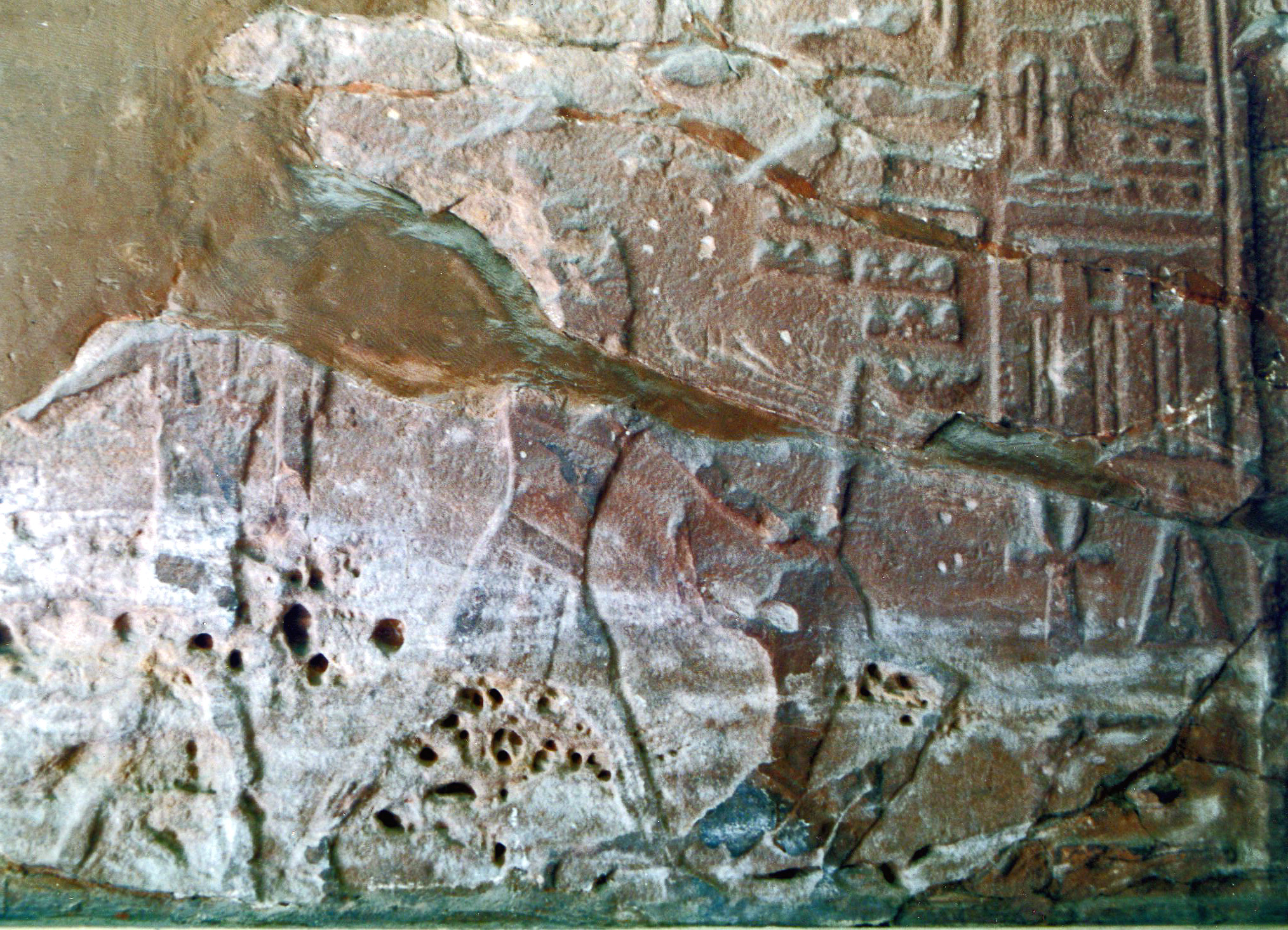
Relief of Nyuserre from the Wadi Maghareh

To the north of Egypt, trade contacts with Byblos on the Levantine coast, which existed during much of the Fifth Dynasty, were seemingly active during Nyuserre's reign, as suggested by a fragment of cylindrical alabaster vase bearing his name uncovered in the city.

East of Egypt, Nyuserre commissioned at least one expedition to the Wadi Maghareh in Sinai, where mines of copper and turquoise were exploited during much of the Old Kingdom. This expedition left a large rock relief, now in the Egyptian Museum in Cairo. (Note: Catalogue number Cairo JE 38570.) The relief shows Nyuserre "smiting the Bedouins (Note: Egyptian Mnṯjw) of all foreign lands, the great god, lord of the two lands". At the right of Nyuserre is a dedication to "Thoth, lord of the foreign lands, who has made pure libations". This expedition departed Egypt from the port of Ain Sukhna, on the western shore of the Gulf of Suez, as revealed by seal impressions bearing Nyuserre's name found on the site. The port comprised large galleries carved into the sandstone serving as living quarters and storage places. The wall of one such gallery was inscribed with a text in ink mentioning the expedition to Sinai and dating it to the year of the second cattle count – possibly Nyuserre's fourth year on the throne.

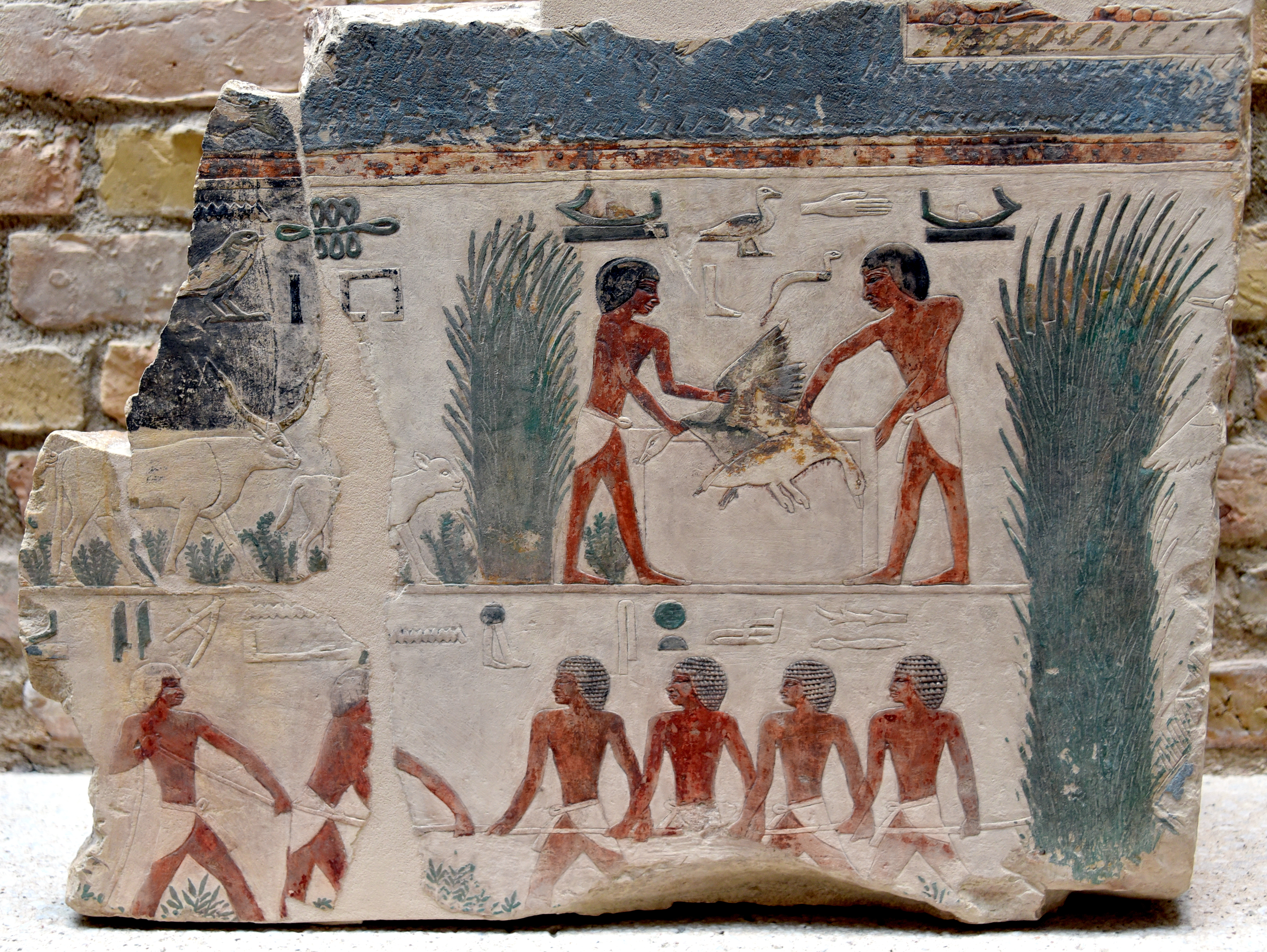
Fowling with a dragnet, agricultural scene, and handling ducks. Wall fragment from the Sun Temple of Nyuserre Ini at Abu Gurob, Egypt. c. 2430 BCE. Neues Museum.

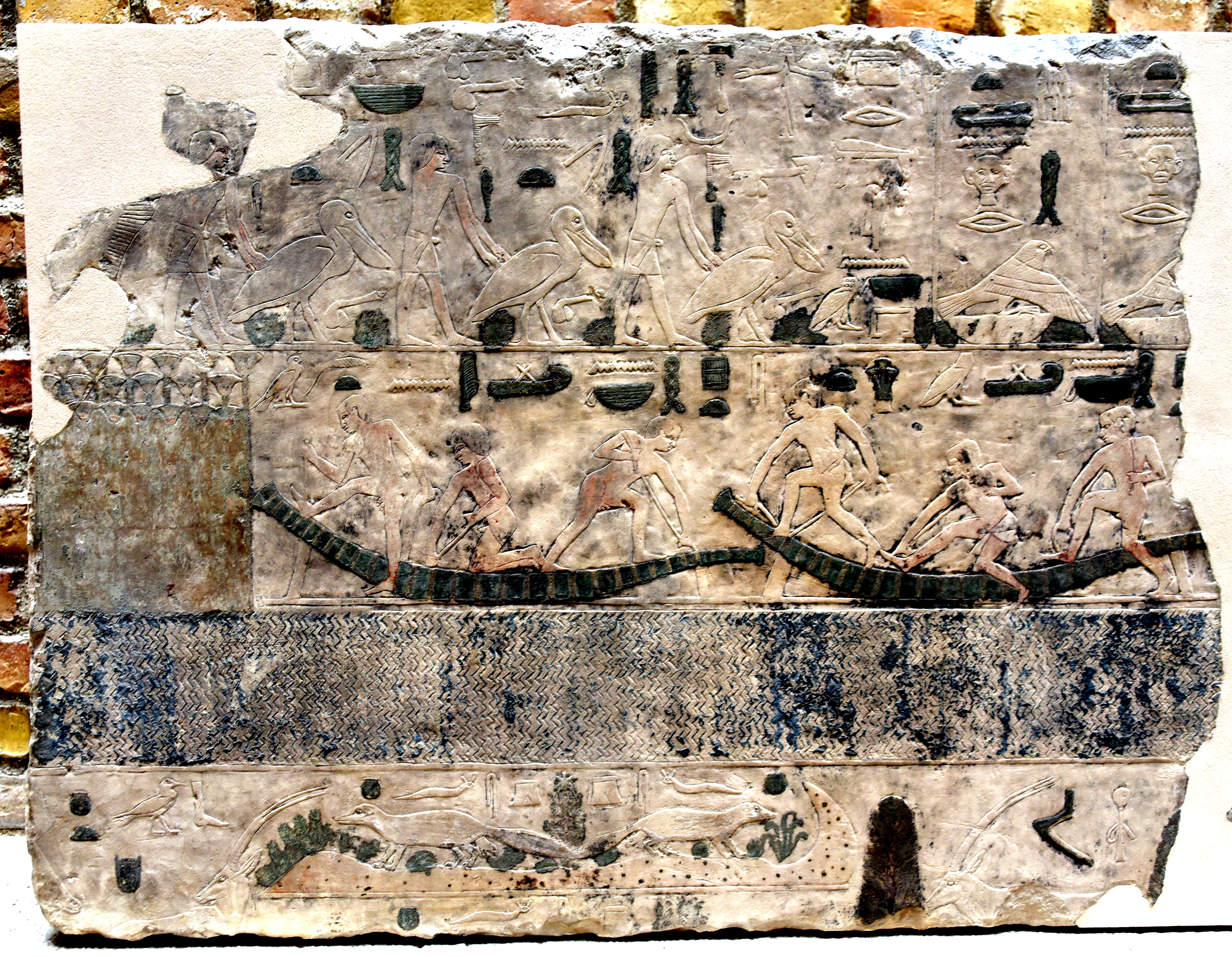
Breeding pelicans and birds, fabrication of boats. Wall fragment from the Sun Sanctuary Temple of Nyuserre Ini at Abu Gurob, Egypt. c. 2430 BCE. Neues Museum.

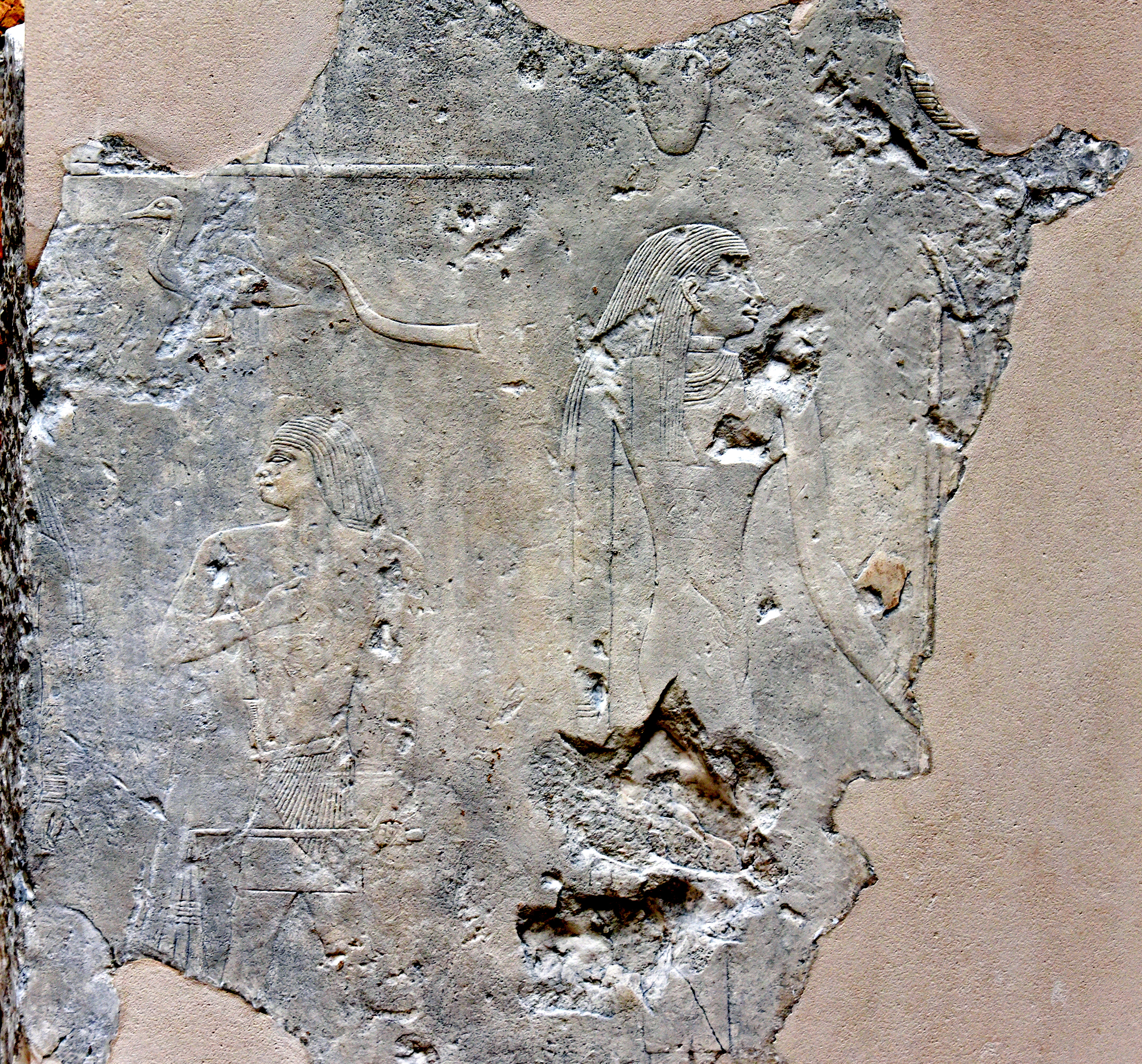
Wall fragment from the Sun Temple of Nyuserre Ini at Abu Gurob, Egypt. c. 2430 BCE. Neues Museum.

To the south of Egypt, in Lower Nubia, Nyuserre exploited the gneiss quarries of Gebel el-Asr near Aswan, which provided material for buildings and statues, (Note: The primary example of Old Kingdom gneiss statue is the Khafre Enthroned) as shown by a fragmentary stone stela inscribed with Nyuserre's Horus name that was discovered in a settlement adjacent to the quarries.

==== Military activity ====
There is little evidence for military action during Nyuserre's reign. William C. Hayes proposed that a few fragmentary limestone statues of kneeling and bound prisoners of war discovered in his mortuary temple possibly attest to punitive raids in Libya to the west or the Sinai and Palestine to the east during his reign. The art historian William Stevenson Smith has pointed out, that such statues were customary elements of the decoration of royal temples and mastabas, suggesting that they may not be immediately related to actual military campaigns. Similar statues and small wooden figures of kneeling captives were discovered in the mortuary complexes of Neferefre, Djedkare Isesi, Unas, Teti, Pepi I and Pepi II as well as in the tomb of vizier Senedjemib Mehi.

== Main building activities ==
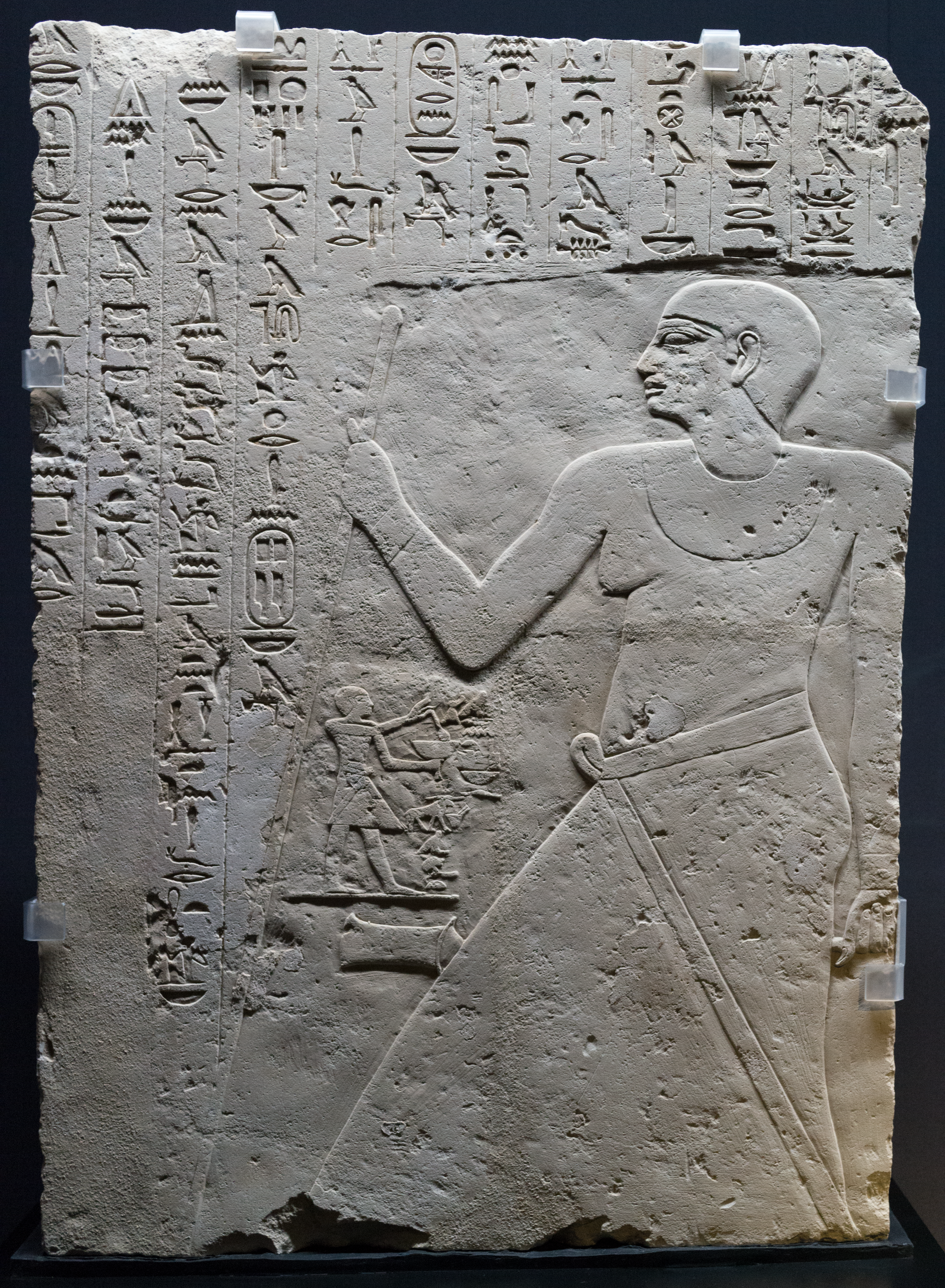
Tomb relief of Iny excavated at Saqqara

Assuming Verner's reconstruction of the Fifth Dynasty royal family, Nyuserre Ini faced an enormous task when he ascended the throne: his father, mother and brother had all left their pyramids unfinished, his father's and brother's sun temples were unfinished too and he had to construct his own pyramid as well as those of his queens. Nyuserre met this challenge by placing his pyramid in the immediate vicinity of the unfinished ones, on the north-eastern corner of that of Neferirkare Kakai and next to that of Sahure, thereby concentrating all pyramid building activities in South Abusir, in an area of 300 m × 300 m (980 ft × 980 ft). This meant that his pyramid was out of the alignment formed by the preceding ones, limited its size and constrained the layout of his mortuary complex. This would explain why, despite having enjoyed one of the longest reigns of the Fifth Dynasty, Nyuserre's pyramid was smaller than that of his father and closer in size to that of his grandfather Sahure. Builders and artisans who worked on Nyuserre's constructions projects lived in the pyramid town "Enduring-are-the-(cult)-places-of-Niuserre", which was very likely located in Abusir between the causeways of Sahure and Nyuserre.

=== Pyramid of Nyuserre ===
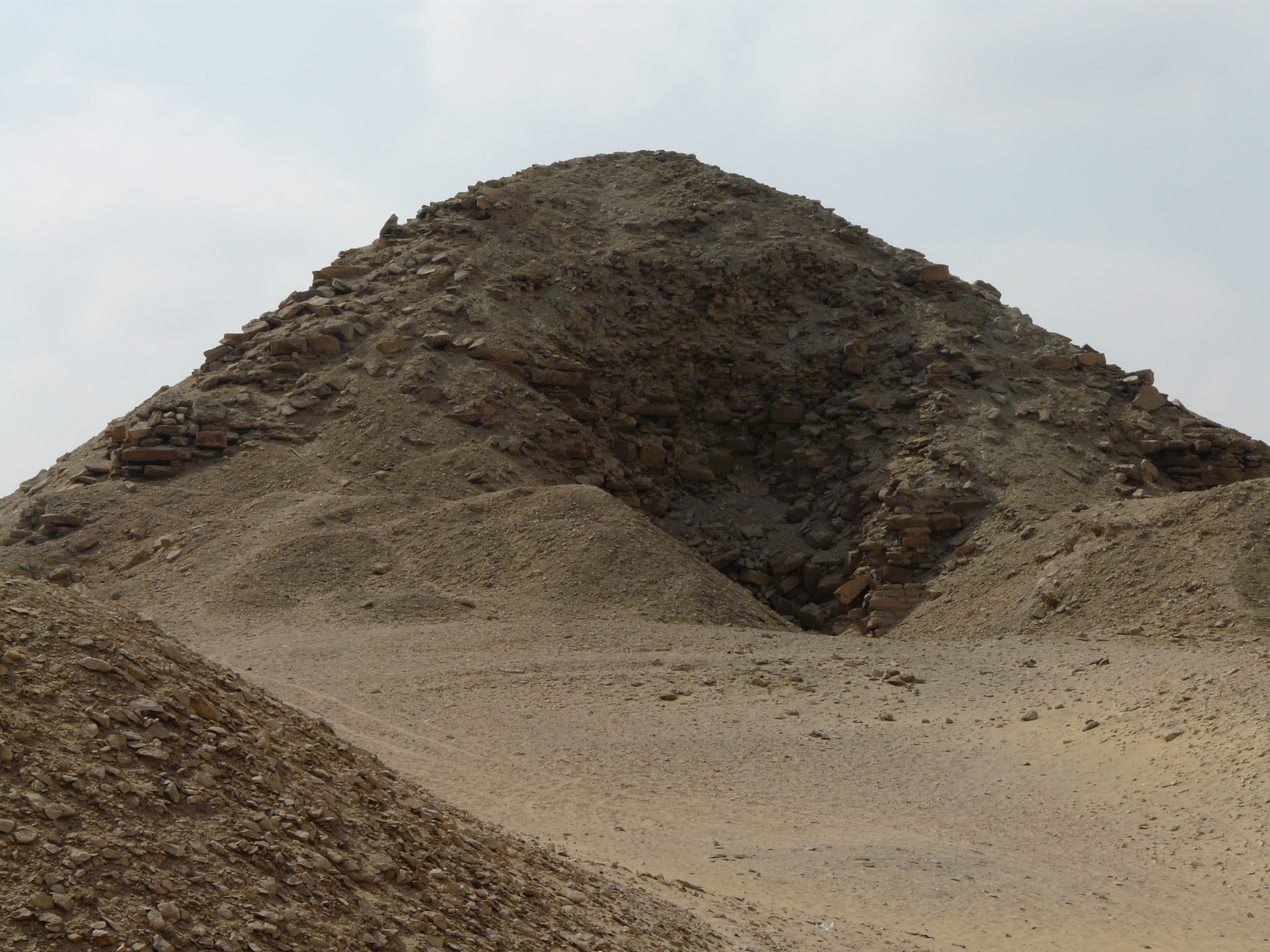
The pyramid of Nyuserre Ini in Abusir

Nyuserre built a pyramid for himself at Abusir named Mensut Nyuserre, (Note: Transliteration Mn-s.wt-Nj-wsr-Rˁ.) meaning "Established are the places of Nyuserre" or "The places of Nyuserre endure".

The completed pyramid was entirely covered in fine limestone. It was about 52 m (171 ft) tall, with a base of 78.8 m (259 ft) along each side, a slope of 52 degrees and a total volume of stone of about 112,000 m^{3} (4,000,000 cu ft). The burial chamber and antechamber were both lined with fine limestone as well and roofed with three tiers of gigantic limestone beams 10 m (33 ft) long weighing 90 tons each.

The pyramid complex is unusual as the outer sections of the mortuary temple are offset to the south of the eastern side of the complex. This allowed Nyuserre to intercept and complete his father's causeway, which led from the valley temple close to the Nile to the pyramid itself on the desert edge. The valley temple of Nyuserre was thus built on the foundations laid by his father for his own unfinished valley temple. Once completed, it consisted of a portico with eight papyriform columns, its floor was of black basalt and its walls were made of limestone with painted reliefs above a dado of red granite. The back of the portico led to the causeway, the base of which was entirely covered in basalt, while its upper portions were decorated with numerous reliefs, some showing the king as a sphinx trampling over his enemies. The causeway was roofed by limestone blocks painted in blue with golden stars. Arriving near the pyramid, the causeway led into a columned courtyard preceded by storage rooms and succeeded by the mortuary temple itself, which housed statues of the king and depictions of the royal family and Nyuserre in the presence of the gods. The wider pyramid complex was enclosed by a wall, with two large rectangular structures on its north-east and south-east corners. Both Lehner and Verner see these as the precursor of the pylon, characteristic of later Egyptian temples. Beyond the main pyramid was a smaller one for the Ka of the king.

=== Pyramid Lepsius XXIV ===
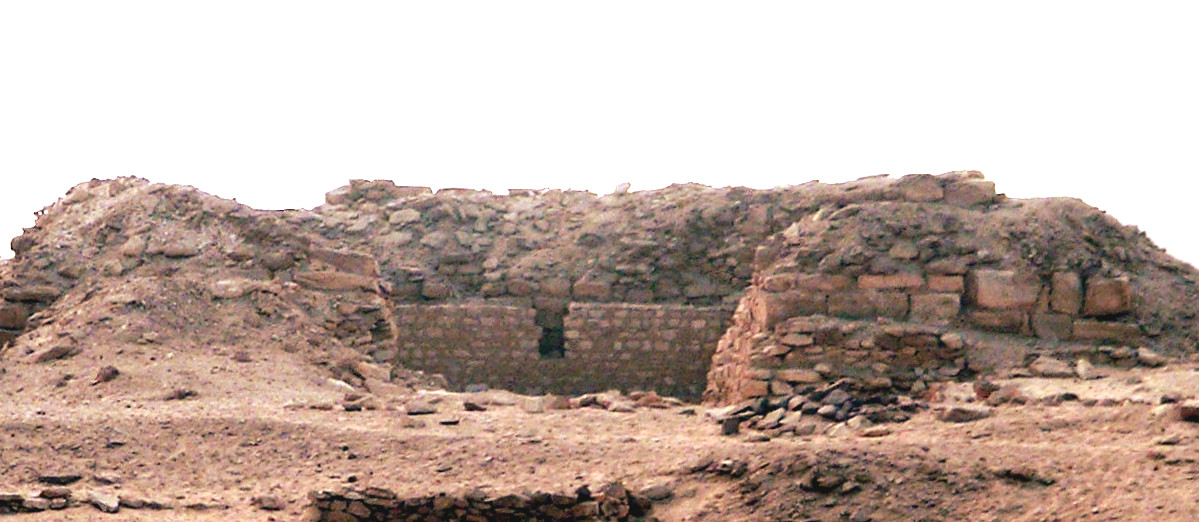
Ruins of the pyramid Lepsius XXIV

South of the pyramid of his mother Khentkaus II, Nyuserre built a pyramid for a queen, either a consort of himself or of his brother Neferefre. The pyramid is known today as Lepsius XXIV, after its number in Karl Richard Lepsius' pioneering list of pyramids. It originally reached about 27 m (89 ft) high with a base of 31.5 m (103 ft), its core made of limestone and clay mortar organised in horizontal and accretion layers.

Today the pyramid is heavily ruined, its outer casing of fine white limestone long gone, and it stands only 5 m (16 ft) tall. While graffiti left by the builders indicate that the construction of this pyramid dates to the later part of Nyuserre's reign and took place under the direction of vizier Ptahshepses, the name of the queen for whom the pyramid was intended is lost. Reptynub has been cited as a likely candidate. In the burial chamber, which is reached via a straight north–south passageway, the broken up mummy of a young woman was discovered. She stood around 160 cm (5.2 ft) tall and died between 21 and 23 years of age. It is unclear whether the mummy is that of the original owner of the pyramid or dates to a later period as the mummification method employed could suggest. Excavations of the burial chamber yielded fragments of a pink granite sarcophagus as well as pieces of large calcite canopic jars and smaller funerary equipment.

On the eastern side of the pyramid, the ruins of a small satellite pyramid as well as of a mortuary temple have been discovered. Both were heavily affected by stone robbing, which started as early as the New Kingdom and reached a climax during the Saite (664–525 BCE) and Persian (525–402 BCE) periods, making a modern reconstruction of the temple layout impossible.

=== Lepsius XXV ===
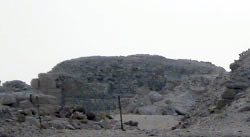
Ruins of Lepsius XXV in Abusir

The ruins known today as Lepsius XXV constitute not one but two large adjacent tombs built as a single monument on the south-eastern edge of the Abusir necropolis. The peculiar construction, which Verner has called a "double pyramid", was known to ancient Egyptians as "The Two are Vigilant". (Note: Ancient Egyptian transliteration: rś mrwj, variously translated as "The two are watchful / vigilant / alert".) The pyramids, both truncated, had rectangular bases of 27.7 m × 21.5 m (91 ft × 71 ft) for the eastern one and 21.7 m × 15.7 m (71 ft × 52 ft) for the western one, their walls reaching an inclination of about 78 degrees. This means that the construction resembled a pair of mastabas more than a couple of pyramids, in fact so much so that Dušan Magdolen proposed that Lepsius XXV is a mastaba.

A further peculiarity of the structure is the lack of associated mortuary temple. Instead, the eastern tomb boasts a small offering chapel built of undecorated white limestone and situated within the tomb superstructure. Its ceiling reached 5 m (16 ft) high. Excavations revealed small pieces of papyrus inscribed with a list of offerings as well as fragments of an alabaster statue of a woman clothed in a simple robe. The burial chamber revealed scant remains of the female owner and a few pieces of funerary equipment.

The western tomb was built subsequently to the eastern one and seems to have served to bury another woman. Builders graffiti uncovered during the Czech excavations demonstrate in all likelihood that the monument was built under Nyuserre, its owners possibly amongst the last members of the broader royal family to be buried in Abusir, the necropolis being abandoned by Nyuserre's successor Menkauhor.

=== Sun Temple ===
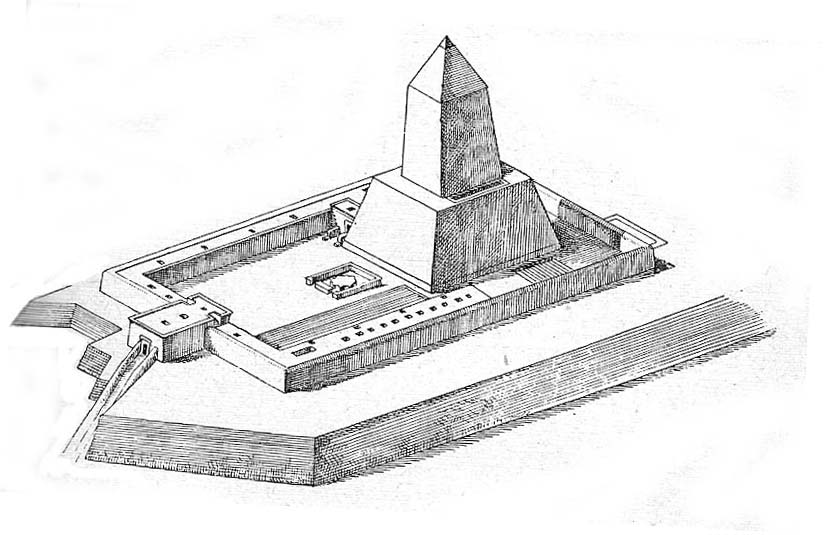
Ludwig Borchardt's reconstruction of the Shesepibre

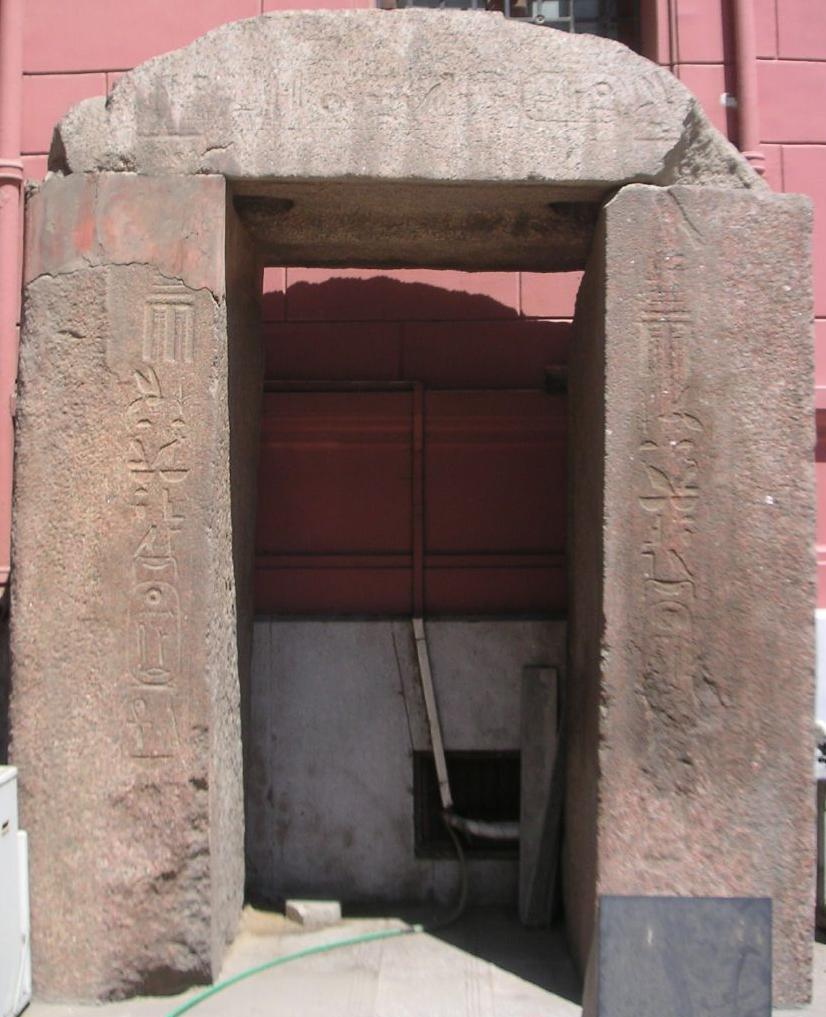
Red granite entrance portico bearing Nyuserre's titulary, likely from his sun temple, Egyptian Museum

Nyuserre was the penultimate Egyptian pharaoh to build a sun temple. In doing so, he was following a tradition established by Userkaf that reflects the paramount importance of the cult of Ra during the Fifth Dynasty. Sun temples built during this period were meant to play for Ra the same role that the pyramid played for the king: they were funerary temples for the sun god, where his renewal and rejuvenation necessary to maintain the order of the world could take place. Cults performed in the temple were thus primarily concerned with Ra's creator function as well as his role as father of the king. During his lifetime, the king would appoint his closest officials to the running of the temple, allowing them to benefit from the temple's income and thus ensuring their loyalty. After the pharaoh's death, the sun temple's income would be associated with the pyramid complex, supporting Nyuserre's funerary cult. The temple continued to function as such until the reign of Teti.

Located in Abu Ghurob, north of Abusir, Nyuserre's sun temple is the largest and best preserved of its kind, leading some Egyptologists such as von Beckerath to see Nyuserre's reign as the peak of the solar cult, an assertion which, according to Grimal, is exaggerated. The temple was known as the Shesepibre by the Ancient Egyptians, (Note: Transliteration Šsp-jb-Rˁ.) which has been variously translated as "Joy of the heart of Re", "Re's Favorite Place", "Delight of Ra", or "Place agreeable to Ra". Curiously, Nyuserre's sun temple was first built in mudbrick, only later to be reconstructed entirely in stone. It is the only such structure to receive this treatment, (Note: As noted in this article, Lehner states that Userkaf's sun temple underwent a similar transformation, albeit less total, while Grimal and von Beckerath emphasise the uniqueness of the Shesepibre in this respect.) thanks to which much of the architectural elements and reliefs have survived to this day. While the reason for this renewal remains unclear, Lehner has proposed that it may be related to Nyuserre's Sed festival, or to some evolution in the ideology surrounding sun temples.

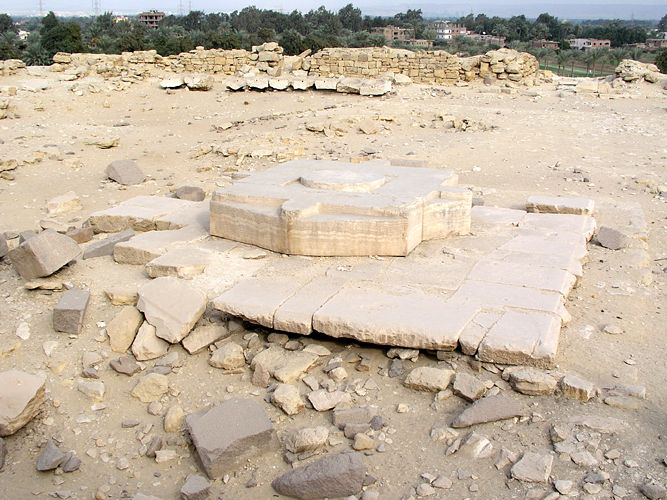
Altar of the sun temple of Nyuserre

The temple was entered from the eastern side following a long causeway which departed from a valley temple located closer to the Nile. This temple mostly served as a gateway to the upper temple and housed a pillared portico of mudbrick encased in yellow limestone. The upper temple comprised a large rectangular courtyard entered via five granite doorways located on its eastern side. An altar was located in the center of the courtyard, which can still be seen today. It was constructed from five large blocks of alabaster, one shaped like the hieroglyph for Ra and the others shaped like the glyph for hotep. They were arranged so as to read Ra Hotep, that is "May Ra be satisfied", from the four cardinal points. The sign for Hotep also means "offering" or "offering table" in Ancient Egyptian, so that the altar was literally an offering table to Ra.

At the western end of the rectangular court was a giant obelisk, a symbol of the sun god Ra. It was built on a pedestal with sloping sides and a square top, like a truncated pyramid, which was 20 m (66 ft) high and was constructed of limestone and red granite around the base. The obelisk topping it was another 36 m (118 ft) high, built entirely of limestone.

The temple was adorned with numerous fine reliefs depicting Nyuserre's Sed festival as well as a "chapel of seasons" attached to the obelisk pedestal, decorated with representations of human activities throughout the seasons.

In December 2025, Italian archaeologists announced the discovery of more than 50 percent of Nyuserre Ini's long lost sun temple's building complex reportedly "1,000 square metres [in size], distinguished by a unique architectural plan that places it among the most significant valley temples in the ancient Memphis region." According to Massimiliano Nuzzolo of the University of Turin:

... last season's excavation yielded a complete quartzite gateway in excellent condition, along with the remains of an internal staircase leading to the roof, suggesting the presence of a secondary entrance in the temple's northwestern sector. Current excavations have also brought to light a sloping ramp that likely connected the temple to the Nile or one of its ancient branches. Early evidence indicates that the temple extends northward, consistent with the architectural layout of Fifth Dynasty royal complexes such as the Valley Temple of King Sahure.

== Completion and restoration works ==
=== Pyramid complex of Neferirkare ===
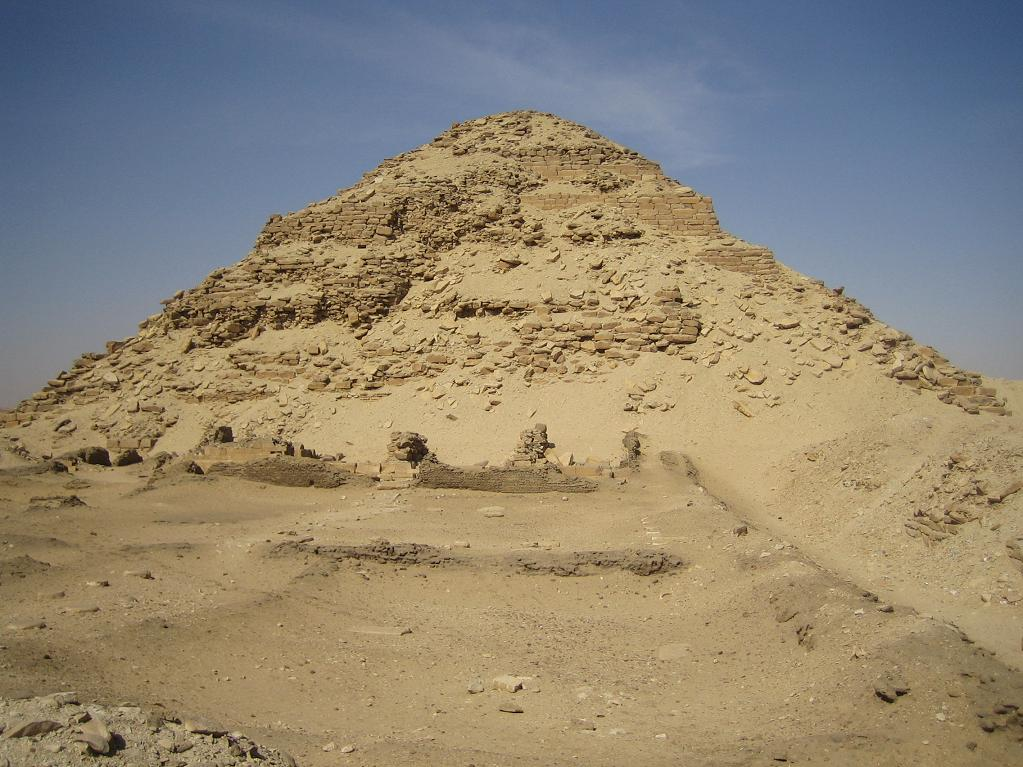
The pyramid of Neferirkare in Abusir

The pyramid of Neferirkare was planned to be significantly larger than that of Neferirkare's Fifth Dynasty predecessors, with a square base side of 105 m (344 ft) and a height of 72 m (236 ft). Although well underway at the death of the pharaoh, the pyramid was lacking its external limestone cladding and the accompanying mortuary temple still had to be built. Neferefre had begun covering the pyramid surface with limestone and had built the foundation of a stone temple on the pyramid eastern side; Nyuserre completed their father's pyramid complex, though he did so more parsimoniously than his brother. He abandoned the task of covering the pyramid altogether and finished the mortuary temple with cheaper materials than were normally used for such buildings. Its walls were made of mud-bricks rather than limestone and its floor was of beaten clay. The outer part of the temple was built to comprise a column portico and a pillared court, all columns being made of wood rather than the usual granite. The temple and pyramid were also surrounded by a brick wall. Likely for reasons of economy, the causeway leading to the mortuary temple at the foot of the pyramid was never built, no satellite pyramid was added to the mortuary complex, and the valley temple was left unfinished. Consequently, the priest of the mortuary cult of Neferirkare lived on the temple premises, in dwellings of mud-bricks and rushes, rather than in the pyramid town closer to the Nile valley.

=== Pyramid of Neferefre ===
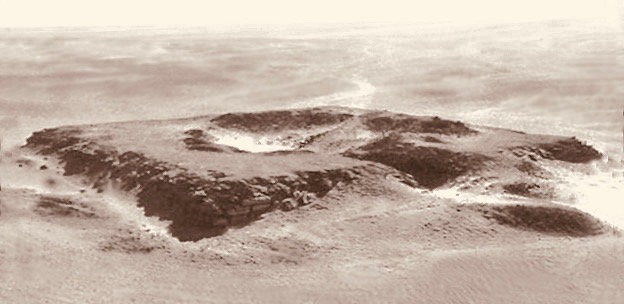
The unfinished pyramid of Neferefre

Construction works on the pyramid of Neferefre had just begun when Neferefre died unexpectedly in his early twenties. At the time of Nyuserre's ascension to the throne, only one step of the core of Neferefre's pyramid had been completed. The substructures, built in a large open pit at the center of the pyramid were possibly unfinished as well. Nyuserre hastily completed the pyramid by transforming it into a stylised primeval mound resembling a mastaba: the walls of the core layer already in place were covered with limestone and the top was filled with clay and stones drawn from the local desert.

The accompanying mortuary temple, which then comprised only a small stone chapel possibly built by the ephemeral Shepseskare, was finished by Nyuserre. Extending over the whole 65 m (213 ft) length of the pyramid side, the temple was built of mudbrick and comprised the earliest hypostyle hall of Ancient Egypt, its roof supported by wooden columns. The hall housed a large wooden statue of the deceased king. Nyuserre also built storage rooms to the north of the hall and, east of it, the "Sanctuary of the Knife" where animals were ritually slaughtered. A column courtyard completed the temple entrance, adorned with two stone columns and 24 wooden ones.

=== Pyramid complex of Khentkaus II ===
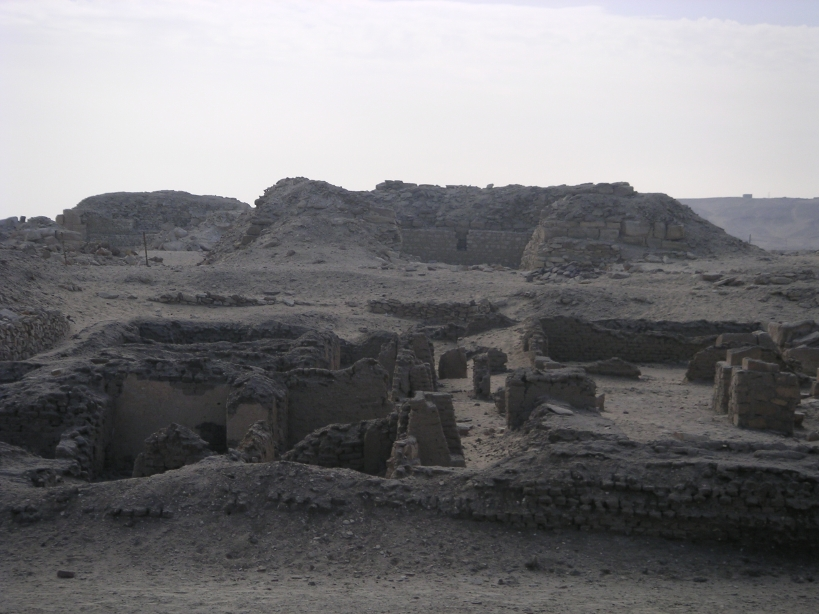
In the foreground, Khentkaus' ruined mortuary temple

Work on the pyramid and mortuary temple of Nyuserre's mother, Khentkaus II, had begun during her husband's rule but was stopped in the tenth year of his reign, at which point only the pyramid core was still uncased. After a delay of 12 years, Nyuserre Ini restarted the building work, and expended much effort in completing the majority of the construction. The motivation for this might have been to legitimise his rule following the premature death of Neferefre and the possible challenge by Shepseskare.

The pyramid is located in Abusir, next to that of Neferikare Kakai, who was Khentkaus' husband and under whose reign the construction of Khentkaus's complex had started. Once completed, the pyramid stood 17 m (56 ft) high, with a side of 25 m (82 ft) at the base and a slope of 52 degrees. Its sepulchral chamber likely housed a sarcophagus of red granite. Today, the pyramid is a 4 m (13 ft) high mound of rubble.

The mortuary temple of the queen, at the eastern foot of the pyramid, was the object of successive completion works during Nyuserre's reign, the earliest one used stone while the latest used only mudbrick. Completely ruined today, the temple seems to have been designed in imitation of the mortuary temples of kings incorporating, for example, a satellite pyramid, and being aligned on an east–west axis. The temple was administratively at least partially independent from the temple of Neferirkare Kakai with which it nonetheless shared some religious services, and it continued to function until the end of the Sixth Dynasty, some 300 years after Khentkaus' lifetime.

=== Valley Temple of Menkaure ===
Archaeological excavations in 2012–2015 revealed that Nyuserre Ini undertook building works on the valley temple of Menkaure, as witnessed by numerous seal impressions bearing his serekh discovered on the site. These works ended a long period from the reign of Shepseskaf until his reign during which the Giza necropolis was not the object of royal attention. Beyond Menkaure's valley temple, Nyuserre apparently also took a wider interest in the administration of the pyramid town of Khafre and revived the cult of both Menkaure and queen Khentkaus I. According to Mark Lehner, this queen, who bore the same name as Nyuserre's mother and like his mother bore two pharaohs, provided Nyuserre with a genealogical link relating him to his Fourth Dynasty forebears. John Nolan believes that the mirroring position and names of both Khentkaus queens was emphasised so that Nyuserre could legitimise his rule after the troubled times surrounding Neferefre's death.

In the valley temple of Menkaure, Nyuserre extended the eastern annex, where he added two sets of alabaster columns, rebuilt the main entrance and refurbished the limestone causeway leading from the valley temple to the high temple. There, Mark Lehner suggested that Nyuserre expanded the inner part of the high temple, notably adding to it a square antechamber with a single central pillar.

=== Sun Temple of Userkaf ===
Userkaf, founder of the Fifth Dynasty, was also the first pharaoh to build a temple to Ra in Abu Gurob. The temple was called Nekhenre by the Ancient Egyptian, which means "The Fortress of Ra", and built in four phases by three pharaohs. Userkaf first constructed a rectangular enclosure with a mound in its center. Sahure or Neferirkare Kakai then transformed this mound into a granite obelisk on a pedestal, adding two statue shrines near its base. The last two phases of construction were undertaken during Nyuserre's reign. Nyuserre first added an inner enclosure of limestone in the pre-existing court, extended the outside enclosure and either completed or built entirely the valley temple. In the last construction phase, Nyuserre encased the inner enclosure in mudbrick, added an altar and five stone benches to the central court, and built an annex to the temple.

=== Temple of Satet ===
A temple dedicated to the goddess Satet, personification of the Nile floods, had stood on the island of Elephantine to the south of Egypt since at least the late Predynastic Period around 3200 BCE. The temple was enlarged and renovated several times from the Early Dynastic Period onwards and was again rebuilt in the course of the Fifth Dynasty, possibly during Nyuserre's reign. A faience plaque bearing Nyuserre's name was discovered in a deposit of votive offerings located under the floor of the sanctuary. Unfortunately, this deposit does not represent the original context of the plaque, which could have once adorned the walls of the temple or could equally have been deposed in a foundational offering made in anticipation of the temple reconstruction.

== Family ==
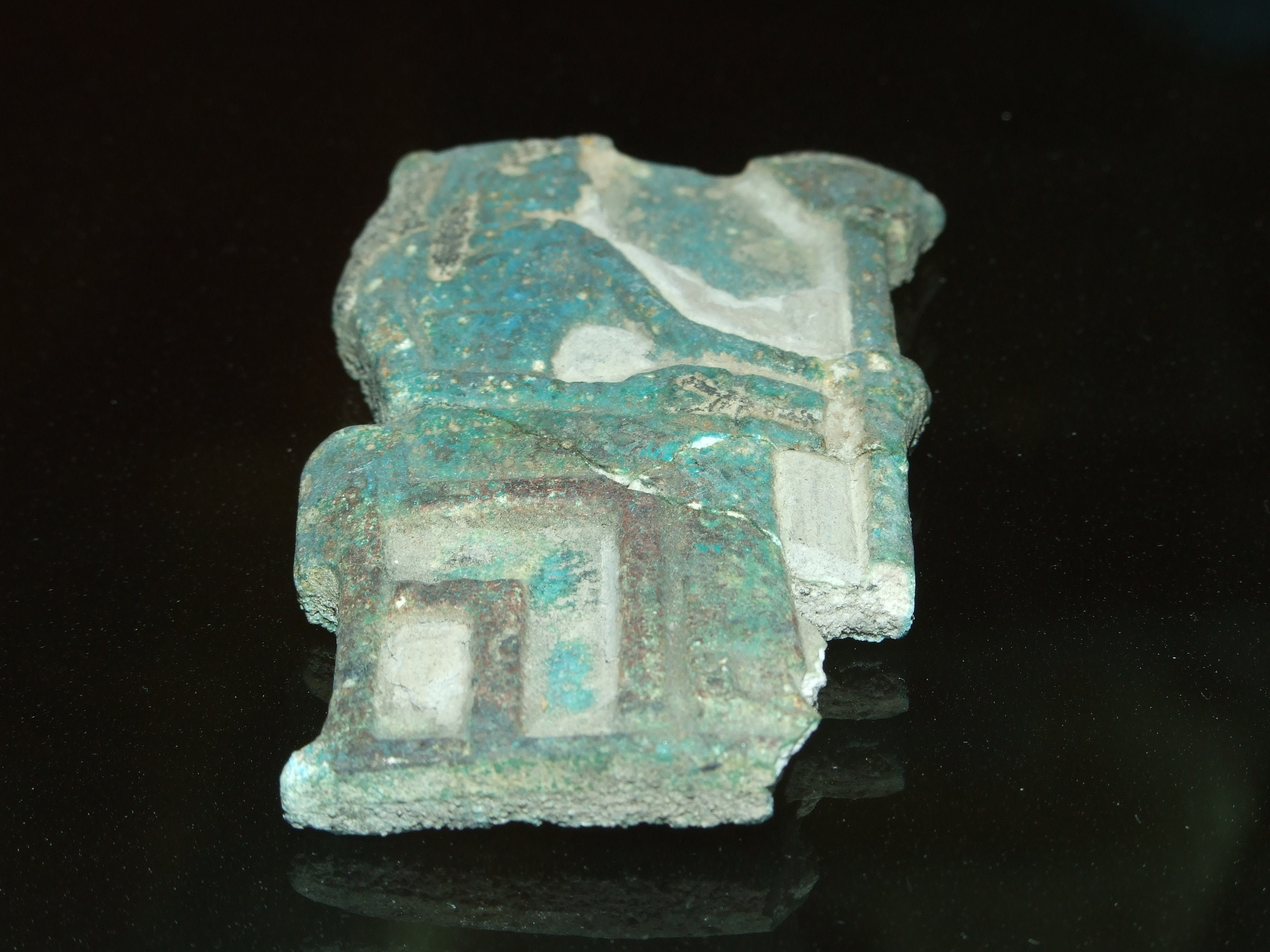
Glazed relief showing Khentkaus II enthroned, Náprstek Museum

=== Parents and siblings ===
The identity of the mother of Nyuserre is known with certainty: it was queen Khentkaus II, in whose mortuary temple a fragmentary relief showing her facing her son Nyuserre and his family has been uncovered. On this relief both Khentkaus and Nyuserre appear on the same scale.

As a corollary, Nyuserre was almost certainly a son of Neferirkare Kakai as Khentkaus II was Neferirkare's queen. This relationship is also indicated by the location of Nyuserre's pyramid in Abusir next to that of Neferirkare, as well as his reuse for his own valley temple of materials from Neferikare's unfinished constructions.

At least one sibling of Nyuserre is known with near-certainty: Neferefre, who was a son of Neferirkare and Khentkaus II, was Nyuserre's elder brother. Since the relation between Shepseskare and Nyuserre remains uncertain, it is possible that the two were brothers too, as suggested by Roth, although the dominant hypothesis is that Shepseskare was a son of Sahure and hence Nyuserre's uncle. Finally, yet another brother, possibly younger than Nyuserre has also been proposed: Iryenre, a prince Iry-pat (Note: Often translated as "Hereditary prince" or "Hereditary noble" and more precisely "Concerned with the nobility", this title denotes a highly exalted position.) whose relationship is suggested by the fact that his funerary cult was associated with that of his mother, both having taken place in the temple of Khentkaus II.

=== Possible children with Reptynub ===
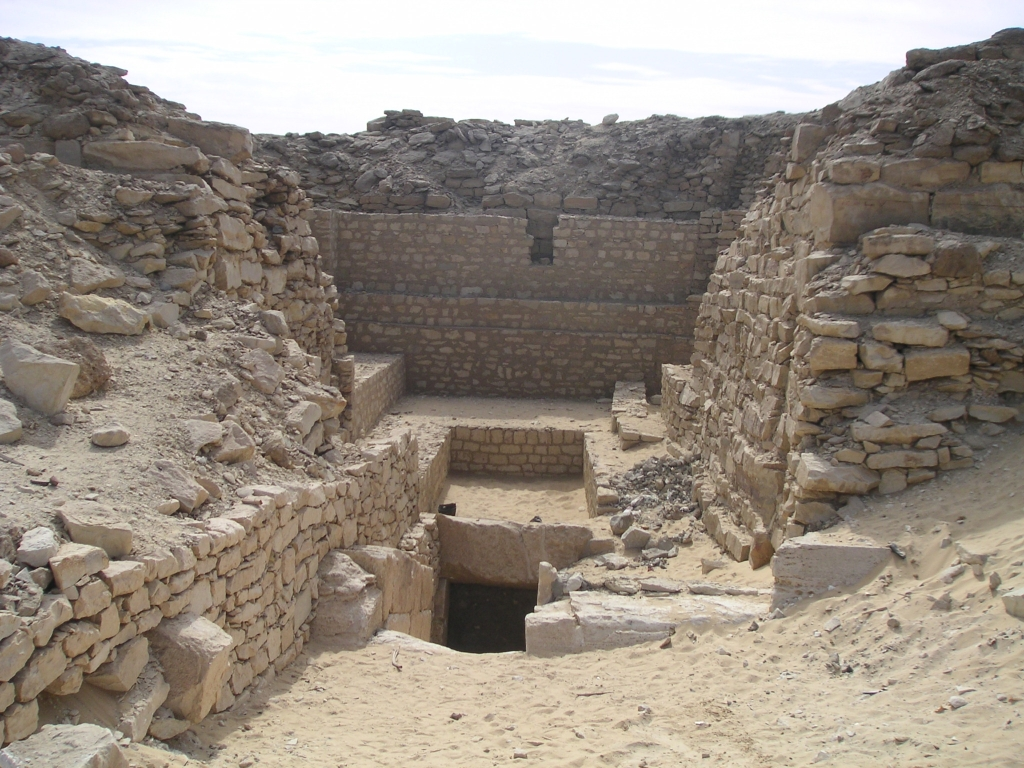
Entrance of the pyramid Lepsius XXIV, believed to belong to a consort of Nyuserre

Nyuserre Ini seems to have had at least two wives, as witnessed by two small pyramids located at the southern end of the pyramid field of Abusir. Known today under the names of Lepsius XXIV and Lepsius XXV given to them by Lepsius in his list of pyramids, both monuments are heavily ruined and the names of their owners cannot be ascertained. One of these two queens was Reptynub, the only known consort of Nyuserre. Her existence and relation to Nyuserre are attested by a fragmentary alabaster statuette (Note: The statuette is now in the Egyptian Museum, Berlin, under the catalogue number 17438.) of her discovered in the valley temple of Nyuserre's pyramid complex. Pieces of relief from the tomb of vizier Ptahshepses give the titles of a queen and while her name is lost, these titles are the same as those that Reptynub bore, leading Egyptologists to propose that these refer to her.

- Nyuserre Ini is known to have had at least one son. His first born, whose name is lost, is represented on several relief fragments from the high temple of his pyramid complex. Beyond the title of Iry-pat and "eldest king's son", he likely held two priestly titles: "lector priest" and "priest of Min". (Note: In Egyptian sm3-Mnw, meaning Sema priest of Min.) Although the name of Nyuserre's eldest son is lost, Michel Baud observes that one relief fragment comprises a "r[e]", possibly part of the prince's name. If so then he would be distinct from Menkauhor Kaiu, Nyuserre's successor.
- Khamerernebty: (Note: Known more completely as Khamerernebty A in modern Egyptology, a denomination aimed at distinguishing her from later Khamerernebtys. For the same reason, Ptahshepses is known as Ptahshepses B.) Suggested by her title of "King's daughter" as well as her marriage to the powerful vizier Ptahshepses. This remains conjectural until direct evidence of this relationship can be discovered. In particular, the only known connection between Reptynub and Khamerernebty are the reliefs from Ptahshepses's tomb, the presence of which would seem natural if Reptynub was Khamerernebty's mother.
- Sheretnebty (c. 2430 BC - c. 2400 BC): Hartwig Altenmüller goes further and hypothesises that Nyuserre had two more daughters, who he believes were buried close to Nyuserre's pyramid. In 2012, her tomb, an hitherto unknown daughter of Nyuserre, was excavated in Abusir south by a team under the direction of Miroslav Bárta. She was married to an important Egyptian official, whose name is lost. According to Bárta, this type of marriage reflects the growing nepotism in the Egyptian elite and the progressive dilution of the king's power.

The precise relationship between Nyuserre and Menkauhor remains uncertain but indirect evidence from the mastaba of Khentkaus III, discovered in 2015, favors the hypothesis that Menkauhor was a son of Neferefre and thus a nephew of Nyuserre rather than his own son. Khentkaus is called "king's wife" and "king's mother" in inscriptions left by the tomb builders. Given the location of the mastaba, close to the pyramid of Neferefre, her husband was likely this pharaoh. Since she was also the mother of a king and since Nyuserre was a brother to Neferefre, the son in question is most probably the future Menkauhor Kaiu, who would thus have succeeded his uncle.

In any case, the succession of Nyuserre seems to have gone smoothly. A seal bearing both Nyuserre's and Menkauhor's names has been uncovered in the mortuary complex of Nyuserre's mother Khentkaus II. A further seal is believed to have both Nyuserre's and Djedkare's names on it, Djedkare Isesi being Nyuserre's second successor. Taken together these seals reveal that, at the very least, Menkauhor and Djedkare did not perceive Nyuserre as an antagonist.

== Legacy ==
As king, Nyuserre Ini benefited from a funerary cult established at his death. Under the umbrella of the term "funerary cult" are grouped various cultic activities of two different types. First, there was an official cult taking place in the king's mortuary complex and which was provided for by agricultural domains established during Nyuserre's reign. This cult was most active until the end of the Old Kingdom but lasted at least until the Twelfth Dynasty during the Middle Kingdom, at which point is the latest known mention of a priest serving in Nyuserre's funerary complex. In later times, the official cult of Nyuserre was essentially reduced to a cult of the royal ancestor figure, a "limited version of the cult of the divine" as Jaromir Malek writes, manifested by the dedication of statues and the compilation of lists of kings to be honoured.

In parallel to that official cult were the more private cults of pious individuals venerating Nyuserre as a kind of "saint", an intercessor between the believers and the gods. This popular cult, which developed spontaneously, perhaps because of the proximity of Nyuserre's pyramid to Memphis, referred to Nyuserre using his birth name Iny, and likely consisted of invocations and offerings to statues of the king or in his mortuary temple. Therefore, archaeological traces of this cult are difficult to discern, yet Nyuserre's special status is manifest in some religious formulae, where his name is invoked, as well as in the onomastics of individuals, notably during the Middle Kingdom, whose names included "Iny", such as Inhotep, Inemsaf, Inankhu and many more. Although the veneration of Nyuserre was originally a local phenomenon from Abusir, Saqqara and their surroundings, it may have ultimately reached even outside of Egypt proper, in Sinai, Byblos and Nubia, where fragments of statues, vessels and stelae bearing Nyuserre's name have been discovered in cultic contexts.

=== Old Kingdom ===
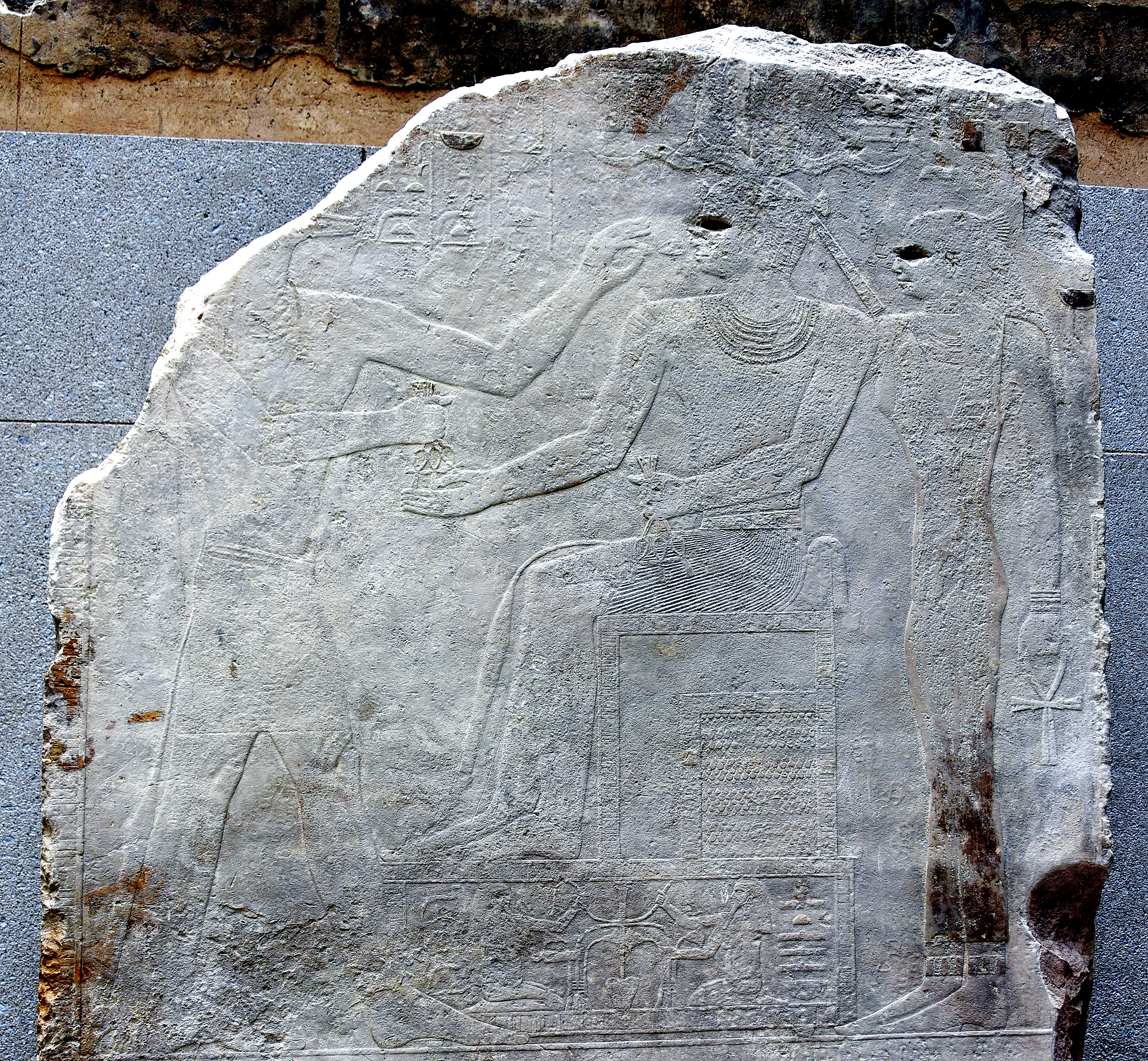
Pharaoh Nyuserre Ini protected by Wadjet and receives life from Anubis. Painted wall fragment from the mortuary temple of Nyuserre Ini at Abusir. Neues Museum.

During the Old Kingdom, provisions for the official funerary cult of Nyuserre Ini were produced in agricultural estates set up during his reign. The names of some of these estates have been found inscribed on the walls of tombs in Saqqara or in Nyuserre's mortuary temple, such as "The track of Ini" (Note: Ancient Egyptian Mṯn-Ini.) and "The offerings of Ini". (Note: Ancient Egyptian Ḥtpwt-Ini) Several Ḥwt domains of the king, which comprise the land holdings of the mortuary temple of Nyuserre, are known: "Hathor wishes that Nyuserre lives", (Note: Ancient Egyptian ḥwt Ny-wsr-Rˁ mr Ḥwt-Ḥr ˁnḫ Ny-wsr-Rˁ.) "Horus wishes that Nyuserre lives", (Note: Ancient Egyptian ḥwt Ny-wsr-Rˁ mr Ḥr ˁnḫ Ny-wsr-Rˁ.) "Bastet wishes that Nyuserre lives", (Note: Ancient Egyptian ḥwt Ny-wsr-Rˁ mr B3stt ˁnḫ Ny-wsr-Rˁ.) and "Ptah desires Nyuserre to live". (Note: Ancient Egyptian mr Ptḥ ˁnḫ Ny-wsr-Rˁ.) Several priests serving in the pyramid complex and sun temple of Nyuserre are known from their tombs until the end of the Sixth Dynasty, showing that the official mortuary cult endured throughout the late Old Kingdom.

Nyuserre furthermore received special attention from at least two of his successors during this period: Djedkare Isesi either restored or completed his funerary temple, (Note: This is witnessed by a fragmentary inscription where Djedkare claims to have undertaken works in Nyuserre's temple. The block bearing the inscription is currently housed in the Berlin Museum, under the catalogue No. 17933.) and Pepi II Neferkare erected a door jamb bearing an inscription mentioning both his first Sed festival and Nyuserre in the latter's valley temple, a close association meant to "evidence the pretended association of the king with his forefather". (Note: The fragmented jamb is now in the Berlin Museum, catalogue No. 17934.)

=== First Intermediate Period ===
Nyuserre is one of the very few Old Kingdom kings for whom there is evidence that the funerary cult continued uninterrupted during the First Intermediate Period, (Note: The Old Kingdom kings whose funerary cult continued to exist during the First Intermediate period are, according to Jaromir Malek, Nyuserre and Teti. Antonio Morales adds Unas to this list, but this is contested by Malek, who sees Unas' funerary cult during the Middle Kingdom as a revival rather than a continuation of existing practices.) when the central authority of the pharaohs had broken down and the Egyptian state was in turmoil. The tombs of two priests Heryshefhotep I and II, who lived during this period, (Note: Malek states that these priests date "probably" to the late Eleventh Dynasty, that is early Middle Kingdom, but does not exclude the possibility of an earlier date, in the First Intermediate Period.) mention their roles and duties in the funerary establishment of Nyuserre, witnessing to the continuing existence of the official mortuary cult.

Nyuserre's effective deification and popular veneration flourished in parallel to the official cult throughout the period, as revealed for example by inscriptions in the tomb of an individual named Ipi, who desires to be "honoured before Iny", (Note: Ancient Egyptian jm3ḫw ḫr Jnjj.) a terminology in which Nyuserre plays a role normally reserved to the gods. Similar qualifications denoting Nyuserre's status are found in tombs dating to the subsequent early Middle Kingdom, such as the mummy chest of an individual named Inhotep, on which he says he is to be "honoured before Osiris, lord of life, and Iny, lord of reverence". (Note: Ancient Egyptian jm3ḫ(w) ḫr Wsir nb ˁnḫ Jnj nb jm3ḫ.)

=== Middle Kingdom ===
The Middle Kingdom saw the decline of the official cult of Nyuserre. Evidence from this period come from works undertaken in the Karnak temple by Senusret I, who dedicated a number of statues of Old Kingdom kings including at least one of Nyuserre, (Note: The statue in question is fragmentary, the lower half being now in the Egyptian Museum of Cairo under the catalogue number CG 42003 and the upper half in the Rochester Memorial Art Gallery, catalogue no. 42.54. The lower part of a black granite statue of Nyuserre, now in the British museum under the catalogue number BM EA 870, may come from Karnak as well.) to a cult of Amun and of the royal ancestors. At the same time, the 12th Dynasty saw the widespread dismantling of many Old Kingdom funerary temples for their materials, which were notably reused in the pyramid complexes of Amenemhat I and Senusret I. These events are contemporaneous with the life of the last priest serving the official cult of Nyuserre, a certain Inhotep. Both of these facts hint at a lapse of royal interest in the state-sponsored funerary cults of Old Kingdom rulers.

=== New Kingdom ===
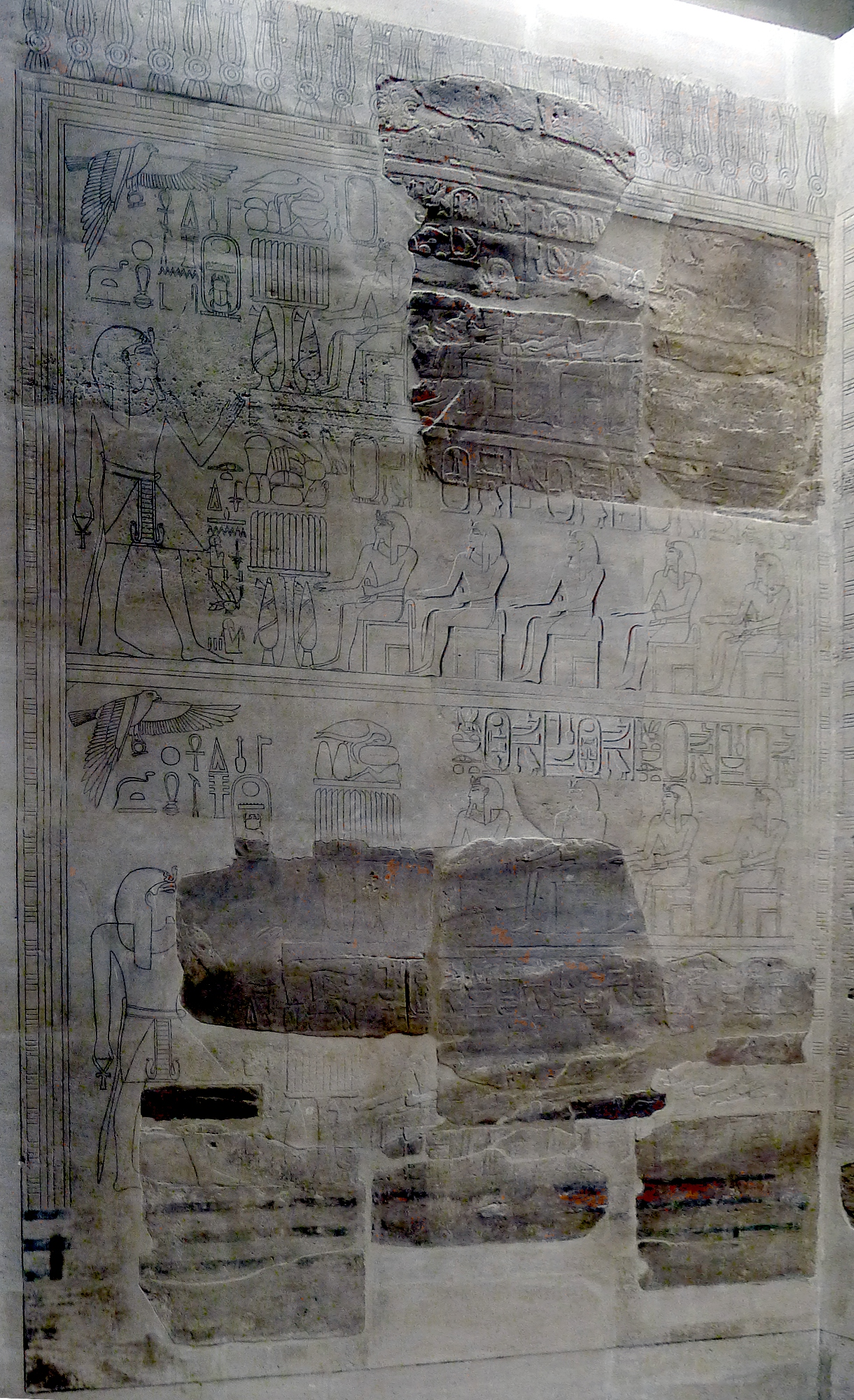
Section of the Karnak list of kings to be honoured by Thutmosis III. Nyuserre is the fourth seated king of the top row.

The popular veneration of Nyuserre during earlier times continued to influence the cults performed during the New Kingdom. This is best exemplified by the Karnak king list, composed during the reign of Thutmosis III, with the purpose of honouring a selection of royal ancestors and which includes the cartouche showing "Iny" for Nyuserre. This choice is unusual, as cartouches normally include the king's praenomen rather than a birth name, "Iny" being likely chosen here because it was under this name that Nyuserre was venerated and had become deified.

Later, during the Ramesside period, statues of Old Kingdom pharaohs including one of Nyuserre Ini were placed in a cachette (a hiding place) in the temple of Ptah in Memphis, suggesting their continued use for cultic purposes until that point. Concurrently with these activities, extensive restoration works in Abusir and Saqqara were undertaken during the reign of Ramses II under the direction of prince Khaemweset. The sun temple of Nyuserre was among the monuments benefiting from these works.

=== Third Intermediate Period ===
During the late Third Intermediate Period, Old Kingdom mortuary temples enjoyed a revival of interest due primarily to the archaizing style favoured by the kings of the Twenty-fifth Dynasty of Egypt (c. 760–656 BCE). In particular, Taharqa fl. c. 690–664 BCE) had reliefs from the temples of Sahure, Nyuserre and Pepi II reproduced in the temple of Amun of Gem-Aten in Karnak during his restoration works there.

== Gallery ==
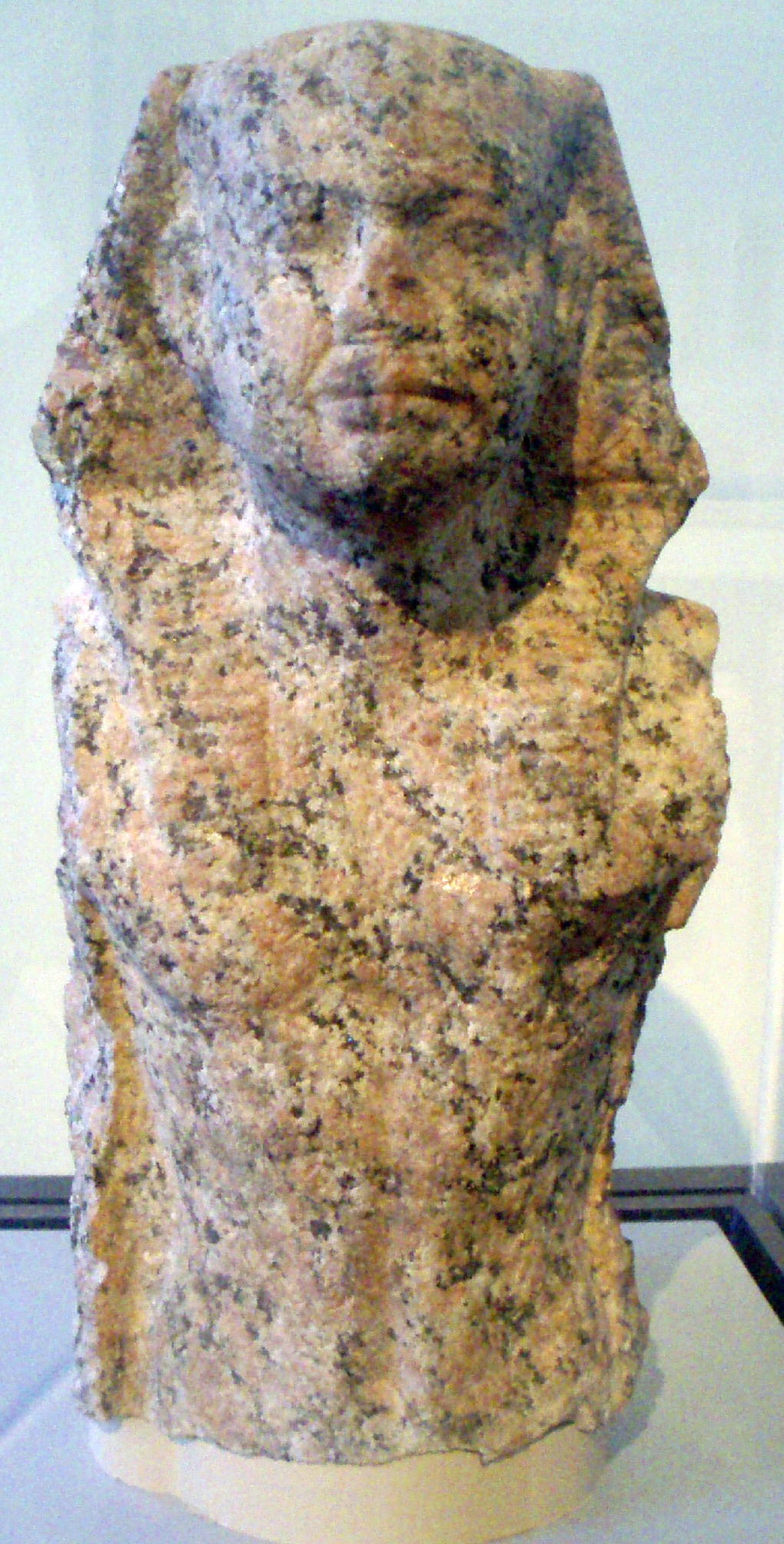
Fragmentary statue of a Fifth Dynasty king, likely to be Nyuserre

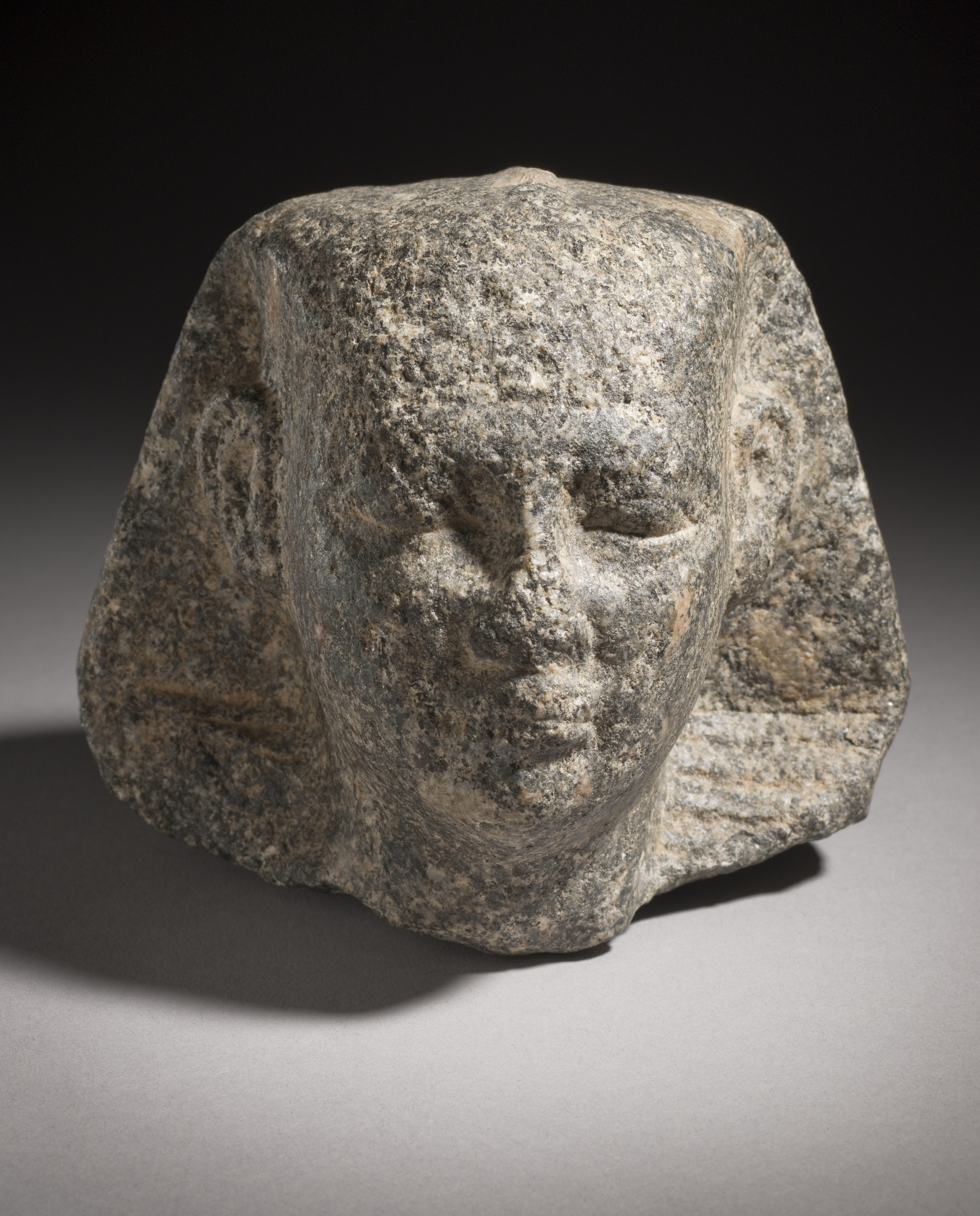
Head of a pharaoh wearing the nemes, possibly Nyuserre

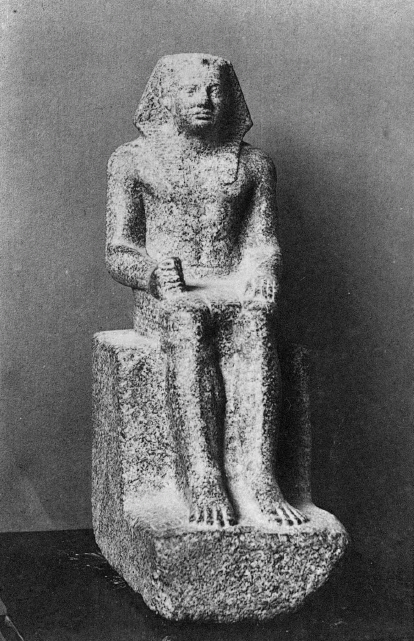
Statuette of Nyuserre Ini of uncertain provenance, now in the Egyptian Museum (Note: Catalogue number CG 38, the statue is 65 cm (26 in) high.)

== Notes, citations and sources ==
=== General sources ===
- AFP (4 January 2015). "Tomb of previously unknown pharaonic queen found in Egypt". The Express Tribune.
- Altenmüller, Hartwig (1990). "Bemerkungen zur Gründung der 6. Dynastie". Hildesheimer Ägyptologische Beiträge. Festschrift Jürgen von Beckerath zum 70. Geburtstag am 19. Februar 1990 (in German). 30. Hildesheim: Pelizaeus-Museum: 1–20.
- Altenmüller, Hartwig (2001). "Old Kingdom: Fifth Dynasty". In Redford, Donald B. (ed.). The Oxford Encyclopedia of Ancient Egypt, Volume 2. Oxford University Press. pp. 597–601. ISBN 978-0-19-510234-5.
- Baer, Klaus (1960). Rank and Title in the Old Kingdom. Chicago: University of Chicago Press. ISBN 978-0-226-03412-6.
- Baker, Darrell (2008). The Encyclopedia of the Pharaohs: Volume I – Predynastic to the Twentieth Dynasty 3300–1069 BC. Stacey International. ISBN 978-1-905299-37-9.
- Bárta, Miroslav (2018). "Egypt's Old Kingdom: The Latest Discoveries at Abusir South". Presentation given at the Harvard Semitic Museum. Archived from the original on 14 November 2021.
- Baud, Michel; Dobrev, Vassil (1995). "De nouvelles annales de l'Ancien Empire Egyptien. Une "Pierre de Palerme" pour la VIe dynastie" (PDF). Bulletin de l'Institut Français d'Archéologie Orientale (in French). 95: 23–92. Archived from the original on 2 April 2015.
- Baud, Michel (1999a). Famille Royale et pouvoir sous l'Ancien Empire égyptien. Tome 1 (PDF). Bibliothèque d'étude 126/1 (in French). Cairo: Institut français d'archéologie orientale. ISBN 978-2-7247-0250-7.
- Baud, Michel (1999b). Famille Royale et pouvoir sous l'Ancien Empire égyptien. Tome 2 (PDF). Bibliothèque d'étude 126/2 (in French). Cairo: Institut français d'archéologie orientale. ISBN 978-2-7247-0250-7. Archived from the original (PDF) on 2 April 2015.
- Bissing, Friedrich Wilhelm von; Kees, Hermann; Borchardt, Ludwig (1905–1928). Das Re-Heiligtum des Königs Ne-Woser-Re (Rathures), I, II, III (in German). Leipzig: J.C. Hinrichs. OCLC 78854326.
- Bissing, Friedrich Wilhelm von (1955). "La chambre des trois saisons du sanctuaire solaire du roi Rathourès (Ve dynastie) à Abousir". Annales du Service des Antiquités de l'Égypte. 53: 319–338.
- Borchardt, Ludwig (1907). Das Grabdenkmal des Königs Ne-user-re'. Ausgrabungen der Deutschen Orient-Gesellschaft in Abusir 1902–1904 (in German). Leipzig: J.C. Hinrichs. OCLC 6724337.
- Borchardt, Ludwig (1911). Catalogue Général des Antiquités Égyptiennes du Musée du Caire Nos 1–1294. Statuen und Statuetten von Königen und Privatleuten. Teil 1 (PDF) (in German). Berlin: Reichsdruckerei. OCLC 71385823.
- Borchardt, Ludwig (1913). Das Grabdenkmal des Königs S'aḥu-Re (Band 2): Die Wandbilder: Abbildungsblätter (in German). Leipzig: Hinrichs. ISBN 978-3-535-00577-1.
- Bothmer, Bernard V. (1974). "The Karnak statue of Ny-user-ra : Membra dispersa IV". Mitteilungen des Deutschen Archäologischen Instituts Abteilung Kairo. 30. Mainz am Rhein: Philip von Zabern: 165–170.
- Brewer, Douglas J.; Teeter, Emily (1999). Egypt and the Egyptians. Cambridge, New York: Cambridge University Press. ISBN 978-0-521-44518-4.
- Brovarski, Edward (2001). Der Manuelian, Peter; Simpson, William Kelly (eds.). The Senedjemib Complex, Part 1. The Mastabas of Senedjemib Inti (G 2370), Khnumenti (G 2374), and Senedjemib Mehi (G 2378). Giza Mastabas. Vol. 7. Boston: Art of the Ancient World, Museum of Fine Arts. ISBN 978-0-87846-479-1.
- Callender, Vivienne (1992). "Volume III: A prosopographical register of the wives of Egyptian kings (Dynasties I-XVII)". The wives of the Egyptian kings: dynasties I-XVII (PhD). Macquarie University. OCLC 221450400.
- Clayton, Peter (1994). Chronicle of the Pharaohs. Thames & Hudson. ISBN 978-0-500-05074-3.
- "Czech expedition discovers the tomb of an ancient Egyptian unknown queen". Charles University website. 21 January 2015.
- de Rougé, Emmanuel (1918). Maspero, Gaston; Naville, Édouard (eds.). Œuvres diverses, volume sixième (PDF). Bibliothèque égyptologique (in French). Vol. 21–26. Paris: Editions Ernest Leroux. OCLC 39025805.
- Dodson, Aidan; Hilton, Dyan (2004). The Complete Royal Families of Ancient Egypt. London: Thames & Hudson Ltd. ISBN 978-0-500-05128-3.
- Dreyer, Günter (1986). Elephantine VIII: der Tempel der Satet: die Funde der Frühzeit und des alten Reiches. Archäologische Veröffentlichungen (in German). Vol. 39. Mainz am Rhein: Zabern. ISBN 978-3-8053-0501-3.
- Dunand, Maurice (1939). Fouilles de Byblos I. 1926–1932. Direction de l'instruction publique et des beaux-arts; Études et documents d'archéologie (in French). Paris: P. Geuthner, Librarie Adrien Maisonneuve. OCLC 79292312.
- Gardiner, Alan (1959). The Royal Canon of Turin. Griffith Institute. OCLC 21484338.
- Goelet, Ogden (1999). "Abu Gurab". In Bard, Kathryn; Shubert, Stephen Blake (eds.). Encyclopedia of the archaeology of ancient Egypt. London; New York: Routledge. pp. 85–87. ISBN 978-0-203-98283-9.
- Grimal, Nicolas (1992). A History of Ancient Egypt. Translated by Ian Shaw. Oxford: Blackwell publishing. ISBN 978-0-631-19396-8.
- Hawass, Zahi; Senussi, Ashraf (2008). Old Kingdom Pottery from Giza. American University in Cairo Press. ISBN 978-977-305-986-6.
- Hayes, William (1978). The Scepter of Egypt: A Background for the Study of the Egyptian Antiquities in The Metropolitan Museum of Art. Vol. 1, From the Earliest Times to the End of the Middle Kingdom. New York: Metropolitan Museum of Art. OCLC 7427345.
- "Head and torso of a king". Brooklyn Museum.
- Hornung, Erik; Krauss, Rolf; Warburton, David, eds. (2012). Ancient Egyptian Chronology. Handbook of Oriental Studies. Section One, Near and Middle East. Leiden, Boston: Brill. ISBN 978-90-04-11385-5. ISSN 0169-9423.
- Jacquet-Gordon, Helen (1962). Les noms des domaines funéraires sous l'ancien empire égyptien. Bibliothèque d'étude (in French). Vol. 34. Le Caire: Imprimerie de l'Institut français d'archéologie orientale. OCLC 18402032.
- Janák, Jiří; Vymazalová, Hana; Coppens, Filip (2010). "The Fifth Dynasty 'sun temples' in a broader context". In Bárta, Miroslav; Coppens, Filip; Krejčí, Jaromír (eds.). Abusir and Saqqara in the Year 2010. Prague: Charles University, Faculty of Arts. pp. 430–442.
- Krejčí, Jaromir (2005). "Pyramid "Lepsius no. XXIV"". Czech Institute of Egyptology.
- Krejčí, Jaromír; Arias Kytnarová, Katarína; Odler, Martin (2015). "Archaeological excavation of the mastaba of Queen Khentkaus III (Tomb AC 30)" (PDF). Prague Egyptological Studies. XV. Czech Institute of Archaeology: 28–42.
- Lehner, Mark (2008). The Complete Pyramids. New York: Thames & Hudson. ISBN 978-0-500-28547-3.
- Lehner, Mark (2011). "A Hundred and One Years Later: Peering into the Menkaure Valley Temple" (PDF). AERA, Working Through Change, Annual Report 2010–2011. Boston: Ancient Egypt Research Associates. Archived from the original (PDF) on 14 August 2020.
- Lehner, Mark; Jones, Daniel; Yeomans, Lisa Marie; Mahmoud, Hanan; Olchowska, Kasia (2011). "Re-examining the Khentkawes Town". In Strudwick, Nigel; Strudwick, Helen (eds.). Old Kingdom, New Perspectives: Egyptian Art and Archaeology 2750–2150 BC. Oxford: Oxbow Books. ISBN 978-1-84217-430-2.
- Lehner, Mark (2015). "Shareholders: the Menkaure valley temple occupation in context". In Der Manuelian, Peter; Schneider, Thomas (eds.). Towards a new history for the Egyptian Old Kingdom: perspectives on the pyramid age. Harvard Egyptological studies. Vol. 1. Leiden, Boston: Brill. ISBN 978-90-04-30189-4.
- Leprohon, Ronald J. (2013). The great name: ancient Egyptian royal titulary. Writings from the ancient world, no. 33. Atlanta: Society of Biblical Literature. ISBN 978-1-58983-736-2.
- Magdolen, Dušan (2008). "Lepsius No XXV: a problem of typology". Asian and African Studies. 17 (2): 205–223.
- Malek, Jaromir (2000a). "The Old Kingdom (c. 2160–2055 BC)". In Shaw, Ian (ed.). The Oxford History of Ancient Egypt. Oxford University Press. ISBN 978-0-19-815034-3.
- Malek, Jaromir (2000b). "Old Kingdom rulers as "local saints" in the Memphite area during the Old Kingdom". In Bárta, Miroslav; Krejčí, Jaromír (eds.). Abusir and Saqqara in the Year 2000. Prag: Academy of Sciences of the Czech Republic – Oriental Institute. pp. 241–258. ISBN 80-85425-39-4.
- Mariette, Auguste (1864). "La table de Saqqarah". Revue Archéologique (in French). 10. Paris: Didier: 168–186. OCLC 458108639.
- Mariette, Auguste (1885). Maspero, Gaston (ed.). Les mastabas de l'ancien empire : fragment du dernier ouvrage de Auguste Édouard Mariette (PDF). Paris: F. Vieweg. OCLC 722498663.
- Morales, Antonio J. (2006). "Traces of official and popular veneration to Nyuserra Iny at Abusir. Late Fifth Dynasty to the Middle Kingdom". In Bárta, Miroslav; Coppens, Filip; Krejčí, Jaromír (eds.). Abusir and Saqqara in the Year 2005, Proceedings of the Conference held in Prague (June 27 – July 5, 2005). Prague: Academy of Sciences of the Czech Republic, Oriental Institute. pp. 311–341. ISBN 978-80-7308-116-4.
- Mumford, G. D. (1999). "Wadi Maghara". In Bard, Kathryn; Shubert, Steven Blake (eds.). Encyclopedia of the Archeology of Ancient Egypt. New York: Routledge. pp. 875–876. ISBN 978-0-415-18589-9.
- Munro, Peter (1993). Das Unas-Friedhof Nord-West I: topographisch-historische Einleitung (in German). Mainz am Rhein: Philipp von Zabern. ISBN 978-3-8053-1353-7.
- "Neuserre". Encyclopædia Britannica.
- Nolan, John (2012). "Fifth Dynasty Renaissance at Giza" (PDF). AERA Gram. Vol. 13, no. 2. Boston: Ancient Egypt Research Associates. ISSN 1944-0014. Archived from the original (PDF) on 1 August 2019.
- "Niuserre BMFA catalog". Boston Museum of Fine Arts. Archived from the original on 22 November 2021.
- Nuzzolo, Massimiliano (2025). "A New Seal-Impression of King Shepseskara and the Fifth Dynasty Chronology". Ägypten und Levante. Internationale Zeitschrift für ägyptische Archäologie und deren Nachbargebiete. 34: 393–418. doi:10.1553/AEundL34s393.
- "Nyuserre on the MMA online catalog". Metropolitan Museum of Art.
- "Nyuserre Ini". Digital Egypt for Universities.
- "Petrie museum, online collection". Petrie Museum.
- "Reliefs from the Shesepibre in the Petrie museum, online collection". Petrie Museum.
- Porter, Bertha; Moss, Rosalind L. B.; Burney, Ethel W. (1981). Topographical bibliography of ancient Egyptian hieroglyphic texts, reliefs, and paintings. III/1. Memphis. Abû Rawâsh to Abûṣîr (PDF) (second, revised and augmented by Jaromír Málek ed.). Oxford: Griffith Institute, Clarendon Press. ISBN 978-0-900416-19-4.
- Porter, Bertha; Moss, Rosalind L. B.; Burney, Ethel W. (1951). Topographical bibliography of ancient Egyptian hieroglyphic texts, reliefs, and paintings. VII Nubia, the deserts, and outside Egypt (PDF). Oxford: Griffith Institute, Clarendon Press. OCLC 312542797.
- Posener-Kriéger, Paule (1976). Les archives du temple funéraire de Neferirkare-Kakai (Les papyrus d'Abousir). Tomes I & II (complete set). Traduction et commentaire. Bibliothèque d'études (in French). Vol. 65. Le Caire: Institut français d'archéologie orientale. OCLC 4515577.
- Rice, Michael (1999). Who is who in Ancient Egypt. Routledge London & New York. ISBN 978-0-203-44328-6.
- Richter, Barbara (2013). "Sed Festival Reliefs of the Old Kingdom". Paper Presented at the Annual Meeting of the 58th Annual Meeting of the American Research Center in Egypt, Wyndham Toledo Hotel, Toledo, Ohio, Apr 20, 2007.
- "Royal Head, Probably King Nyuserre". Los Angeles County Museum of Art.
- Roth, Silke (2001). Die Königsmütter des Alten Ägypten von der Frühzeit bis zum Ende der 12. Dynastie. Ägypten und Altes Testament (in German). Vol. 46. Wiesbaden: Harrassowitz. ISBN 978-3-447-04368-7.
- Ryholt, Kim (1997). The Political Situation in Egypt during the Second Intermediate Period, c. 1800–1550 B.C. CNI publications, 20. Carsten Niebuhr Institute of Near Eastern Studies, University of Copenhagen : Museum Tusculanum Press. ISBN 978-87-7289-421-8.
- Schmitz, Bettina (1976). Untersuchungen zum Titel s3-njśwt "Königssohn". Habelts Dissertationsdrucke: Reihe Ägyptologie (in German). Vol. 2. Bonn: Habelt. ISBN 978-3-7749-1370-7.
- Shaw, Ian (2003). "New fieldwork at Gebel el-Asr: "Chephren's diorite quarries"". In Hawass, Zahi; Pinch Brock, Lyla (eds.). Egyptology at the Dawn of the Twenty-first Century: Archaeology. Cairo, New York: American University in Cairo Press. ISBN 978-977-424-715-6.
- Smith, William Stevenson (1949). A History of Egyptian Sculpture and Painting in the Old Kingdom (second ed.). Oxford: Oxford University Press for the Museum of Fine Arts, Boston. OCLC 558013099.
- Strouhal, Eugen; Černý, Viktor; Vyhnánek, Luboš (2000). "An X-ray examination of the mummy found in pyramid Lepsius no. XXIV at Abusir". In Bárta, Miroslav; Krejčí, Jaromír (eds.). Abusir and Saqqara in the Year 2000 (PDF). Prag: Academy of Sciences of the Czech Republic – Oriental Institute. pp. 543–550. ISBN 80-85425-39-4. Archived from the original on 1 February 2011.
- Strudwick, Nigel (1985). The Administration of Egypt in the Old Kingdom: The Highest Titles and Their Holders (PDF). Studies in Egyptology. London; Boston: Kegan Paul International. ISBN 978-0-7103-0107-9.
- Strudwick, Nigel C. (2005). Texts from the Pyramid Age. Writings from the Ancient World (book 16). Atlanta: Society of Biblical Literature. ISBN 978-1-58983-680-8.
- Tallet, Pierre (2015). "Les "ports intermittents" de la mer Rouge à l'époque pharaonique : caractéristiques et chronologie". NeHeT – Revue numérique d'Égyptologie (in French). Vol. 3.
- Tyldesley, Joyce (2005). À la découverte des pyramides d'Égypte. Champollion (in French). Translated by Nathalie Baum. Monaco: Éditions du Rocher. ISBN 978-2-268-05326-4.
- Vachala, Břetislav (1979). "Ein weiterer Beleg für die Königin Repewetnebu?". Zeitschrift für Ägyptische Sprache und Altertumskunde (in German). Vol. 106. p. 176. ISSN 2196-713X.
- Van de Mieroop, Marc (2011). A history of ancient Egypt. Blackwell history of the ancient world. Chichester, West Sussex; Malden, MA: Wiley-Blackwell. ISBN 978-1-4051-6071-1.
- Verner, Miroslav (1976). "Czechoslovak Excavations at Abusir". Abstracts of Papers, First International Congress of Egyptology, October 2–10, 1976. Munich. pp. 671–675.
- Verner, Miroslav (1980a). "Excavations at Abusir". Zeitschrift für Ägyptische Sprache und Altertumskunde. Vol. 107. pp. 158–169.
- Verner, Miroslav (1980b). "Die Königsmutter Chentkaus von Abusir und einige Bemerkungen zur Geschichte der 5. Dynastie". Studien zur Altägyptischen Kultur (in German). Vol. 8. pp. 243–268.
- Verner, Miroslav (1985). "Un roi de la Ve dynastie. Rêneferef ou Rênefer ?". Bulletin de l'Institut Français d'Archéologie Orientale (in French). 85: 281–284.
- Verner, Miroslav; Zemina, Milan (1994). Forgotten pharaohs, lost pyramids: Abusir (PDF). Praha: Academia Škodaexport. ISBN 978-80-200-0022-4. Archived from the original on 1 February 2011.
- Verner, Miroslav; Posener-Kriéger, Paule; Jánosi, Peter (1995). Abusir III : the pyramid complex of Khentkaus. Excavations of the Czech Institute of Egyptology. Praha: Universitas Carolina Pragensis: Academia. ISBN 978-80-200-0535-9.
- Verner, Miroslav (1997a). The Pyramids: the mystery, culture, and science of Egypt's great monuments. New York: Grove Press. ISBN 978-0-8021-3935-1.
- Verner, Miroslav (1997b). "Further thoughts on the Khentkaus problem" (PDF). Discussions in Egyptology. Vol. 38. pp. 109–117. ISSN 0268-3083.
- Verner, Miroslav (2000). "Who was Shepseskara, and when did he reign?". In Bárta, Miroslav; Krejčí, Jaromír (eds.). Abusir and Saqqara in the Year 2000 (PDF). Prague: Academy of Sciences of the Czech Republic, Oriental Institute. pp. 581–602. ISBN 978-80-85425-39-0. Archived from the original on 1 February 2011.
- Verner, Miroslav (2001a). "Archaeological Remarks on the 4th and 5th Dynasty Chronology" (PDF). Archiv Orientální. 69 (3): 363–418.
- Verner, Miroslav (2001b). "Old Kingdom: An Overview". In Redford, Donald B. (ed.). The Oxford Encyclopedia of Ancient Egypt, Volume 2. Oxford University Press. pp. 585–591. ISBN 978-0-19-510234-5.
- Verner, Miroslav (2007). "New Archaeological Discoveries in the Abusir Pyramid Field". Archaeogate.
- Verner, Miroslav (2012). "Pyramid towns of Abusir". Studien zur Altägyptischen Kultur. 41: 407–410. JSTOR 41812236.
- Verner, Miroslav (2014). Sons of the Sun. Rise and decline of the Fifth Dynasty. Prague: Charles University in Prague, Faculty of Arts. ISBN 978-80-7308-541-4.
- von Beckerath, Jürgen (1982). "Niuserre". In Helck, Wolfgang; Otto, Eberhard (eds.). Lexikon der Ägyptologie. Band IV: Megiddo – Pyramiden (in German). Wiesbaden: Harrassowitz. pp. 517–518. ISBN 978-3-447-02262-0.
- von Beckerath, Jürgen (1997). Chronologie des pharaonischen Ägypten : die Zeitbestimmung der ägyptischen Geschichte von der Vorzeit bis 332 v. Chr. Münchner ägyptologische Studien (in German). Vol. 46. Mainz am Rhein: Philipp von Zabern. ISBN 978-3-8053-2310-9.
- von Beckerath, Jürgen (1999). Handbuch der ägyptischen Königsnamen (in German). Münchner ägyptologische Studien, Heft 49, Mainz : Philip von Zabern. ISBN 978-3-8053-2591-2.
- Waddell, William Gillan (1971). Manetho. Loeb classical library, 350. Cambridge, Massachusetts; London: Harvard University Press; W. Heinemann. OCLC 6246102.
- Wildung, Dietrich (1969). Die Rolle ägyptischer Könige im Bewußtsein ihrer Nachwelt. Teil I. Posthume Quellen über die Könige der ersten vier Dynastien. Münchner Ägyptologische Studien (in German). Vol. 17. Berlin: Verlag Bruno Hessling. OCLC 635608696.
- Wilkinson, Toby (2000). Royal annals of ancient Egypt: the Palermo stone and its associated fragments. Studies in Egyptology. London, New York: Kegan Paul International: distributed by Columbia University Press. ISBN 978-0-7103-0667-8.
- Zibelius-Chen, Karola (1978). Ägyptische Siedlungen nach Texten des Alten Reiches. Beihefte zum Tübinger Atlas des Vorderen Orients (in German). Vol. 19, Reihe B. Wiesbaden: Reichert. ISBN 978-3-88226-012-0.
- Ziegler, Christiane (2007). Le Mastaba d'Akhethetep. Fouilles du Louvre à Saqqara (in French). Vol. 1. Paris, Louvain: Musée du Louvre, Peeters. ISBN 978-2-35031-084-8.

Preceded by Shepseskare (most likely) or Neferefre	King of Egypt c. 2458 BC - c. 2422 BC	Succeeded by Menkauhor Kaiu
