= Princess Khamerernebty =

Khamerernebty
G16 xa mr D21 D21
Ḫꜥ mrr nb.tj
- Years active: c. 2450 BC
- Spouse: Ptahshepses
- Children: Ptahshepses, Kahotep, Qednes, Hemakhti, and Meritites
- Parent(s): Nyuserre Ini; Reptynub

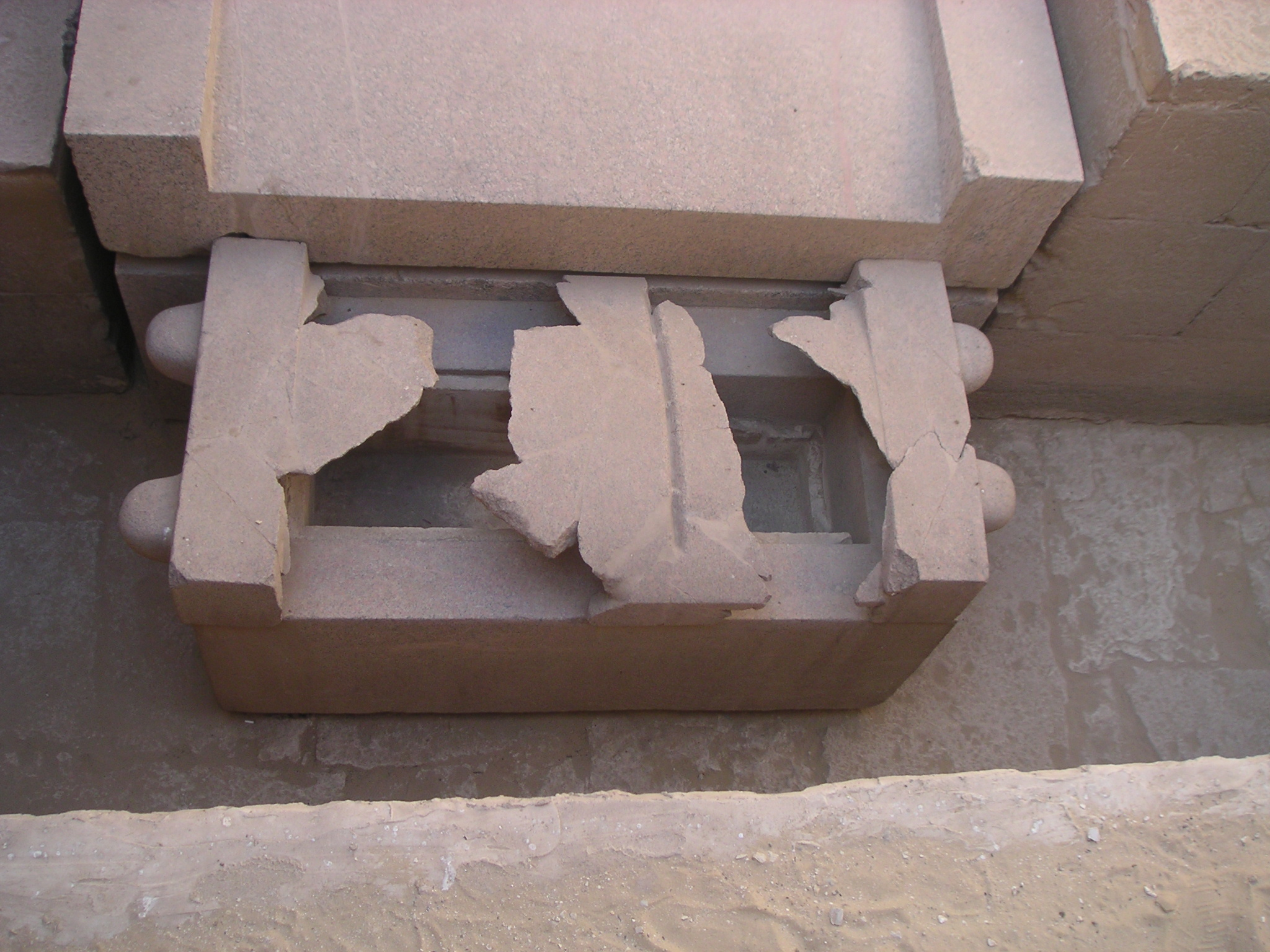
Sarcophagus of Khamerernebty

Abusir pyramidy complex (Note: Current Perspective)

Mastaba's false door with inscriptions of Princess titles (Note: Title Princess Khamerernebty (A) on false inner frame "Khamerernebty, the King’s beloved daughter, Priestess of Hathor in all his sites")

Khamerernebty A (fl. c. 2450 BC) was a daughter of King Nyuserre Ini of ancient Egypt from the 5th Dynasty. She was married to Ptahshepses (a vizier). Her name means Appearance of the beloved of the Two Ladies.

== Biography ==
Khamerernebty was a daughter of King Nyuserre Ini. It is not known who her mother was. The principal wife of her father was Reptynub, but there is no evidence she was Khamerernebty's mother.
Princess Mastaba is located on the north side in the second row in front of Niuserre’s pyramid temple, behind the three mastabas of User-kafankh, an anonymous tomb, and the mastaba of Djadjaemankh, overall heavily damaged; only the false door has been preserved; now in a Berlin museum.

Khamerernebty married a vizier named Ptahshepses. Their children are mentioned in Ptashepses' tomb at Abusir: sons Ptahshepses, Kahotep, Qednes, and Hemakhti, and daughter Meritites, who had the title "King's Daughter", even though being only the granddaughter of a king. Verner mentions an additional son named Kafini, whose image and name were systematically removed. Ptahshepses had two sons named Ptahshespses.

The mastaba of Ptahshepses contained two sarcophagi: one for himself, and a slightly smaller one probably meant for Khamerernebty. The sarcophagus of Khamerernebty was part of the original design of the tomb, and must have been included before the conclusion of the mastaba. Khamerernebty's name has been found on limestone blocks, being inscribed by the builders. Khamerernebty was buried in the mastaba belonging to her husband. She also had a finished burial chamber in the Mastaba of the Princesses located near the north-east corner of Nyuserre's pyramid. Khamerernebty shared the Mastaba of the Princesses with a princess named Meritites and a courtier named Kahotep. But this tomb was apparently never used.

== Ancestry ==
Ancestors of Princess Khamerernebty

Sahure
Neferirkare Kakai
Nyuserre Ini
Khentkaus II
Khamerernebty
