= Ptahshepses =

Ancient Egyptian Vizier

- Vizier of Egypt
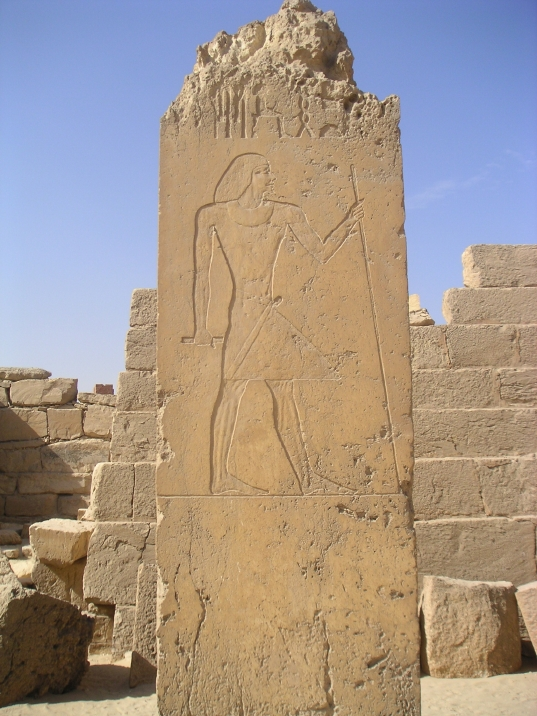
- Ptahshepses depicted on the pillar of his mastaba
Egyptian name
p t H A51 s s A52Ptḥ-Šp.ss
- Tenure: c. 2450 BC
- Pharaoh: Ini
- Burial: Abusir, Egypt
- Spouse: Khamerernebty
- Children: Ptahshepses; Kahotep; Qednes; Hemakhti; Meritites

Ptahshepses (fl. c. 2450 BC) was the vizier and son-in-law of king Nyuserre Ini during the Fifth Dynasty. As such he was one of the most distinguished members of the royal court. Ptahshepses' mastaba complex in Abusir is considered by many to be the most extensive and architecturally unique non-royal tomb of the Old Kingdom.

== Discovery of the Mastaba ==
In 1843, Richard Lepsius of Berlin University designated the Abusir site next to the pyramid complex of Sahure as "pyramid no. XIX" and subsequently published this in his Denkmaeler aus Aegypten und Aethiopien. Jacques de Morgan's excavation of the site in 1893 revealed the site was actually part of a mastaba. It was not until some seventy years later that the Czech Institute of Egyptology revived interest in the site with its discovery of the complete structure in a series of excavations from 1960 to 1974 led primarily by Zbyněk Žába and Abdu al-Qereti.

== Mastaba design ==
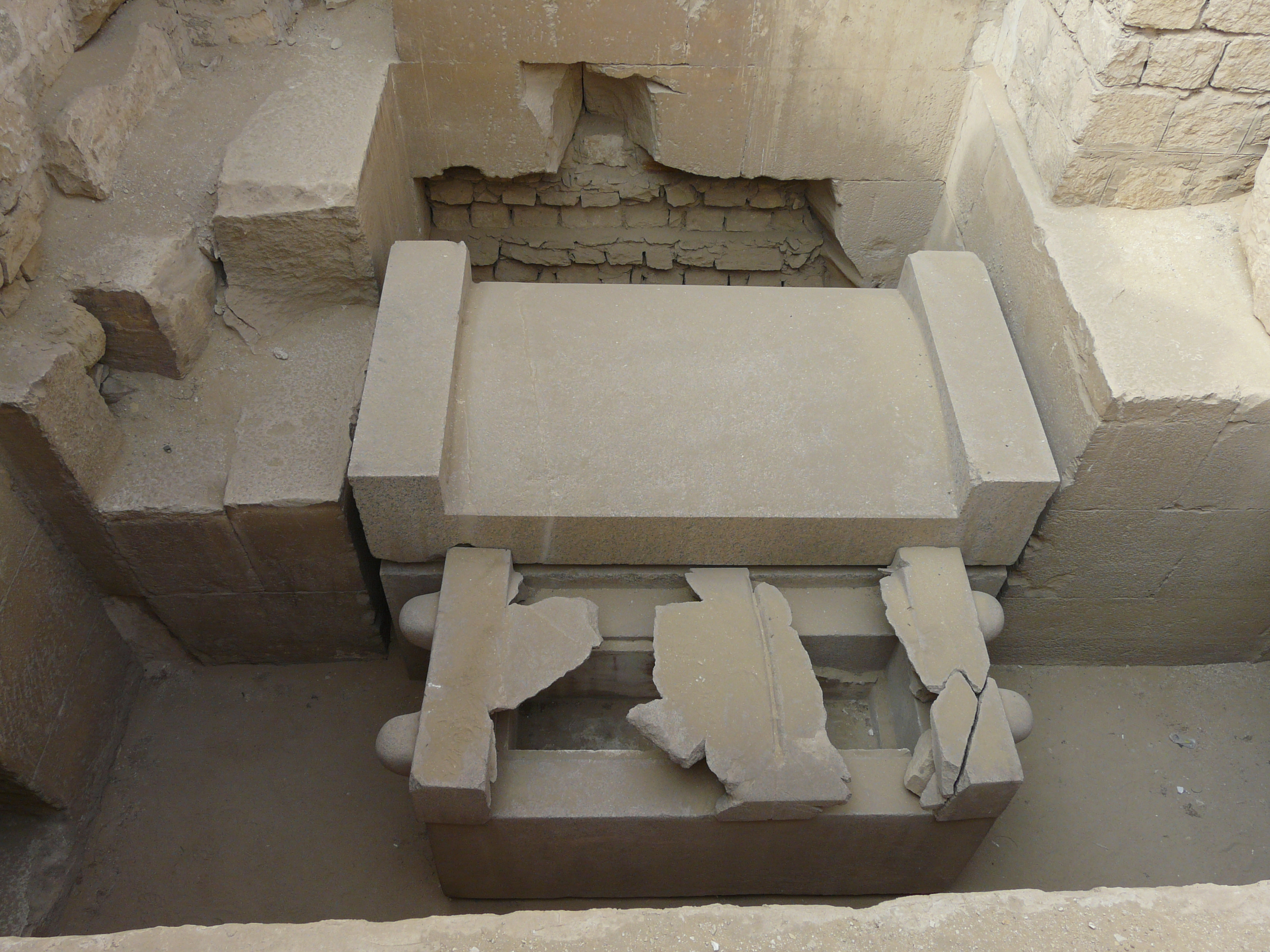
Ptahshepses' sarcophagus

The mastaba of Ptahshepses was built in three phases. The entrance of the tomb, documented by de Morgan and confirmed by Zaba, is located in the northeast corner of the complex. It consists of two six-meter-high eight-stemmed fine white limestone columns shaped as lotuses, which supported a fine limestone architrave under slabs of limestone for a roof terrace. The columns represent the oldest known examples of their type from ancient Egypt.

The entrance leads to a room with six-stemmed lotus columns, built in the second enlargement phase of the mastaba and was originally to serve as an entrance to the mastaba but was closed off in the third phase of enlargement. The walls of this room are decorated with scenes of boats and preparations for Ptahshepses' mortuary cult, as well as his biographical inscription. A narrow passageway containing pictures of Ptahshepses and animals being sacrificed leads to a chapel containing fragments of statues that once stood in three niches. The northern wall of the chapel bears reliefs showing Ptahshepses overseeing agricultural work and servants bearing offerings, and the southern wall, fisherman and herdsman bearing poultry offerings at Ptahshepses's feet. Near the narrow passageway is another relief depicting Ptahshepses' six sons walking. The name of the first son, now known to be Khafini, is chiseled off. Two sons shared the name Ptahshepses, while the other three were called Kahotep, Hemakhty, and Khenu.

North of the chapel are four magazines containing cult vessels likely used in the chapel. The chapel opens into a twenty-limestone-pillared courtyard built in the third phase of enlargement. These columns bear life-sized pictures of Ptahshepses and are arranged in such a way to lead a visitor to the large altar in the center, to the original mastaba entrance, and ultimately to Ptahshepses' burial chamber. Additionally, the courtyard is decorated with reliefs, few of which have remained in situ. Southeast of the courtyard are the treasury and granary magazine complexes. The burial chamber is located in the northwest corner of the tomb. Although heavily robbed, two granite sarcophagi, a large one for Ptahshepses and a smaller one for his wife Khamerernebty are well preserved. One of the most notable features of the mastaba is a room in the southwest corner of the tomb which resembles a boat. Just like the surrounding pyramids, the mastaba was robbed many times, and Ptahshepses' mummy was destroyed. In the New Kingdom, a workshop was erected inside of the mastaba for the dismantling of the tomb and the reuse of the stone in other works. This destruction continued until the Roman era and left the tomb in ruins and under sand.

== Life of Ptahshepses ==
An inscription near the entrance of the mastaba details the biography of Ptahshepses, similar to Weni the Elder's and Harkhuf's; however, the upper portions of the biography are missing so the beginning of each line is unknown. From the reliefs throughout the complex, he is given several titles:

The count, the sole companion... the keeper of the headdress... the favorite of his Lord... the chief justice, the vizier, the overseer of all the works of the King, the servant of the throne, the lector-priest... the revered one by his lord, the overseer of the Two Chambers of the King's ornament, the count, the sole companion, the lector-priest Ptahshepses.

Additionally, he is called “barber of the Great House” and “manicure of the Great House.” These roles were a great honor because they required touching the king, a religious incarnation himself. Ptahshepses's high social rank is also supported by three distinct statues in the mastaba's chapel, which suggest his roles as an official, as a priest, and as a private individual. Many of the mastaba's features, including the granary and treasury magazines, the boat room, and two boat pits outside of the complex suggest inspiration from royal architecture. The location of the mastaba, almost equidistant from and in front of Sahure's and Niuserre's pyramid complexes on the desert plateau also suggest a deliberate attempt at associating him with royalty.

Ptahshepses married King Nyuserre's daughter, Khamerernebty. Their five children are mentioned in the tomb: sons Ptahshepses, Kahotep, Qednes and Hemakhti, and daughter Meritites, who had the title “King's Daughter”, even though being only the granddaughter of a king.

The princess's sarcophagus logistically could not have been moved into the burial chamber of Ptashepses's mastaba by the narrow descending passage. Ludwig Borchardt discovered Khamerernebty's own mastaba near Niuserre's pyramid complex. Therefore, the princess's sarcophagus must have been placed in Ptahshepses's burial chamber when the mastaba was being built. Additionally, the princess's name is found recorded by the builders on the blocks used to construct the core of the mastaba. This enables Egyptologists to date the beginning of the construction of Ptahshepses' mastaba from before the tenth regnal year until the thirtieth regnal year of king Niuserre.
