= Djedkare Isesi =

Ancient Egyptian pharaoh

- Djedkara, Izezi, Izzj, Asosi, Tankeris
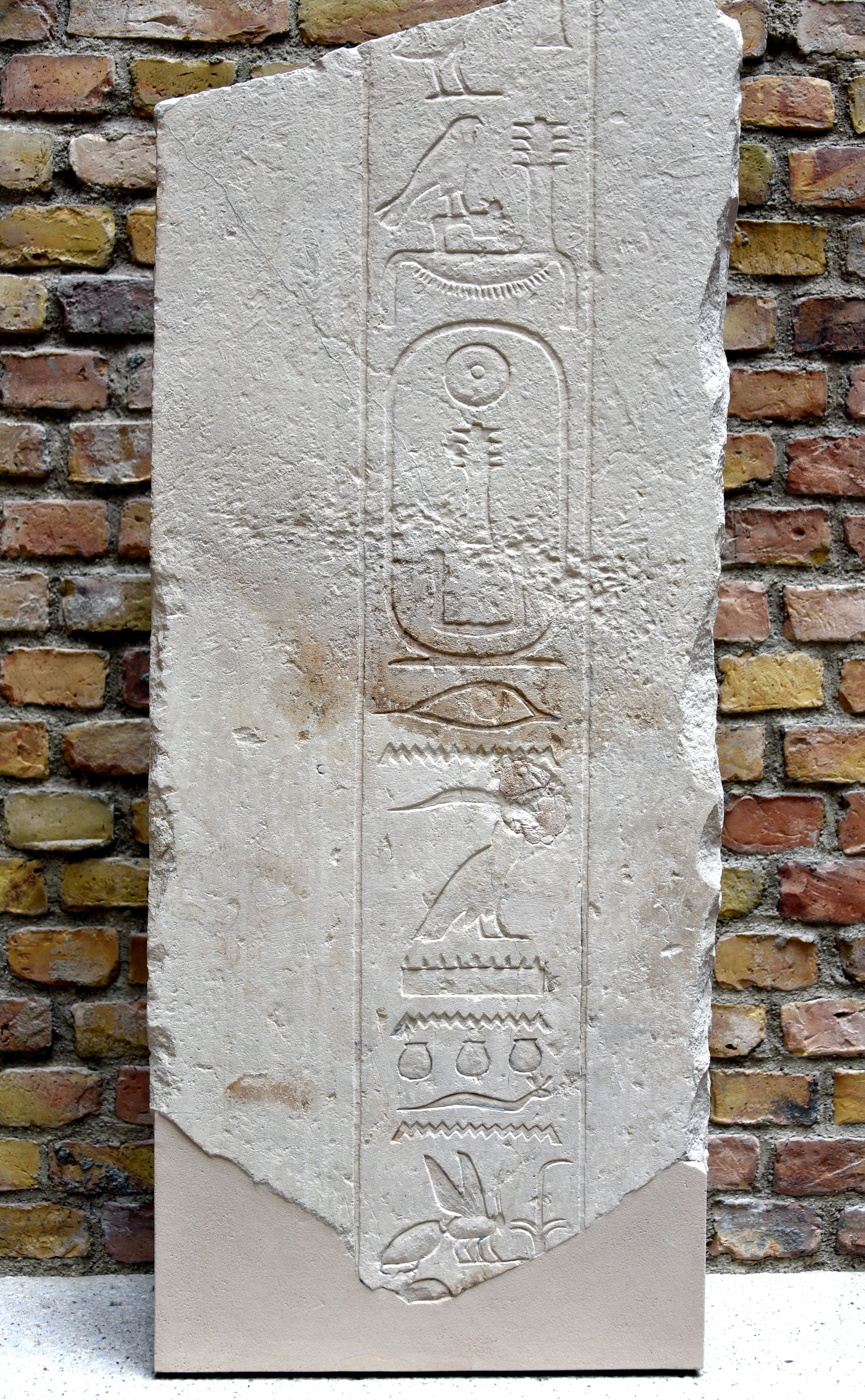
- Part of a door jamb showing the cartouche of Djedkare Isesi, Neues Museum, Berlin

Pharaoh
- Reign: Duration uncertain, at least 33 years and possibly more than 44 years, in the late-25th to mid-24th century BC (Note: Proposed dates for Djedkare Isesi's reign: 2436–2404 BC, 2414–2375 BC 2405–2367 BC, 2380–2342 BC, 2379–2352 BC, 2365–2322 BC.)
- Predecessor: Menkauhor Kaiu
- Successor: Unas
Royal titulary
Horus name
Djedkhau
Ḏd-ḫˁ.w
Horus, enduring of appearances
G5	N28 R11 G43
Nebty name
Djedkhau Nebty
Ḏd-ḫˁ.w Neb.tj
Enduring of appearances (by means of?)
the Two Ladies
G16	R11 N28 G43
Golden Horus
Bik Nebu Djed
Bik-nbw-Ḏd
The enduring Golden Falcon
R11 G5 S12
Prenomen
Djedkare
Ḏd-k3-Rˁ
The enduring one of the Ka of Ra
The soul of Ra endureth
M23 t L2 t < N5 R11 D28 >
Saqqara Tablet:
Maatkare
M3ˁ.t-k3-Rˁ
He of the Maat and Ka of Ra
< N5 H6 D28 >
Turin canon:
Djedu
Ḏdw
He has endured
< R11 R11 > G7
Abydos King List:
Djedkare
Ḏd-k3-Rˁ
The enduring one of the Ka of Ra
< N5 R11 D28 >
Karnak king list:
Isesi
Izzj
< i s s i >
Nomen
Isesi
Izzi
Translation uncertain, possibly
from the imperative iz for "go!", which could have
been said by a midwife during Djedkare's birth

G39 N5	M17 O34 O34 M17
- Consort: Setibhor
- Children: Neserkauhor♂, Kekheretnebti♀, Meret-Isesi♀, Hedjetnebu♀, Nebtyemneferes♀ Uncertain: Raemka♂, Kaemtjenent♂, Isesi-ankh♂ Conjectural: Unas♂
- Burial: Pyramid of Djedkare Isesi
- Dynasty: Fifth Dynasty

Djedkare Isesi (known in Greek as Tancheres) was a pharaoh, the eighth and penultimate ruler of the Fifth Dynasty of Egypt in the late 25th century to mid-24th century BC, during the Old Kingdom. Djedkare succeeded Menkauhor Kaiu and was in turn succeeded by Unas. His relationship to both of these pharaohs remain uncertain, although it is often conjectured that Unas was Djedkare's son, owing to the smooth transition between the two pharaohs.

Djedkare Isesi likely enjoyed a reign of more than 40 years, which heralded a new period in the history of the Old Kingdom. Breaking with a tradition followed by his predecessors since the time of Userkaf, Djedkare did not build a temple to the sun god Ra, possibly reflecting the rise of Osiris in the Egyptian pantheon. More significantly, Djedkare effected comprehensive reforms of the Egyptian state administration, the first undertaken since the inception of the system of ranking titles. He also reorganised the funerary cults of his forebears buried in the necropolis of Abusir and reformed the corresponding priesthood.

Djedkare commissioned expeditions to Sinai to procure copper and turquoise, to Nubia for its gold and diorite and to the fabled Land of Punt for its incense. One such expedition had what could be the earliest recorded instance of oracular divination undertaken to ensure an expedition's success. The word "Nub", meaning gold, to designate Nubia is first recorded during Djedkare's reign. Under his rule, Egypt also entertained continuing trade relations with the Levantine coast and made punitive raids in Canaan. In particular, one of the earliest depictions of a battle or siege scene was found in the tomb of one of Djedkare's subjects.

Djedkare is believed to have been buried in a pyramid in Saqqara named Nefer Djedkare ("Djedkare is perfect"), which is now ruined owing to theft of stone from its outer casing during antiquity. When excavated in the 1940s, the burial chamber contained mummified skeletal remains thought to belong to Djedkare. Examinations of the mummy revealed the individual died in his fifties. A clue to the identity of the remains came from skeletal and blood type comparisons with those of two females thought to be Djedkare's daughters buried in the nearby Southern Cemetery at Abusir. Radio carbon dating carried out on the effects of the three individuals revealed a common range of 2886–2507 BC, some 160–390 years older than the accepted chronology of the 5th Dynasty. More recently radiocarbon dating on 9 samples (calibration with INTCAL20) returned a date between 2503 and 2449 BC (95.4%). This is somewhat earlier than the current consensus of late 25th and early 24th century BC for the reign of Djedkare.

After his death, Djedkare was the object of a cult that lasted at least until the end of the Old Kingdom. He seemed to have been held in particularly high esteem during the mid-Sixth Dynasty, whose pharaohs lavished rich offerings on his cult. Archaeological evidence suggests the continuing existence of this funerary cult throughout the much later New Kingdom (c. 1550–1077 BC). Djedkare was also remembered by the ancient Egyptians as the Pharaoh of Vizier Ptahhotep, the purported author of The Maxims of Ptahhotep, one of the earliest pieces of philosophic wisdom literature.

The reforms implemented by Djedkare are generally assessed negatively in modern Egyptology as his policy of decentralization created a virtual feudal system that transferred much power to the high and provincial administrations. Some Egyptologists such as Naguib Kanawati argue that this contributed heavily to the collapse of the Egyptian state during the First Intermediate Period, c. 200 years later. These conclusions are rejected by Nigel Strudwick, who says that in spite of Djedkare's reforms, Ancient Egyptian officials never amassed enough power to rival that of the king.

== Attestations ==
=== Contemporaneous sources ===
Djedkare is well attested in sources contemporaneous with his reign. (Note: Numerous artefacts bearing Djedkare's nomen, prenomen or serekh have been unearthed, which provide information about trade relations or the state administration during Djedkare's reign. These artifacts are now scattered throughout the world in many museums including the Louvre Museum, the Petrie Museum, the Metropolitan Museum of Art, the Boston Museum of Fine Arts, and the Egyptian Museum of Berlin.) The tombs of many of his courtiers and family members have been discovered in Giza, (Note: Cemetery 2000 in Giza contains several tombs of overseers and inspectors of the palace attendants who lived during Djedkare's reign.) Saqqara and Abusir. They give insights into the administrative reforms that Djedkare conducted during his reign and, in a few cases, even record letters that the king sent to his officials. These letters, inscribed on the walls of tombs, typically present royal praises for the tomb owner.

Another important source of information about Egypt during the reign of Djedkare is the Abusir papyri. These are administrative documents, covering a period of 24 years during Djedkare's reign; they were discovered in the mortuary temples of pharaohs Neferirkare Kakai, Neferefre and queen Khentkaus II. In addition to these texts, the earliest letters on papyrus preserved to the present day also date to Djedkare's reign, dealing with administrative or private matters.

=== Historical sources ===
Djedkare is attested in four ancient Egyptian king lists, all dating to the New Kingdom. The earliest of these is the Karnak king list, dating to the reign of Thutmose III (1479–1425 BC), where Djedkare is mentioned on the fifth entry. Djedkare's prenomen occupies the 32nd entry of the Abydos King List, which was written during the reign of Seti I (1290–1279 BC). Djedkare is also present on the Saqqara Tablet (31st entry) where he is listed under the name "Maatkare", probably because of a scribal error. Djedkare's prenomen is given as "Djed" on the Turin canon (third column, 24th row), probably because of a lacuna affecting the original document from which the canon was copied during the reign of Ramses II (1279–1213 BC). The Turin canon credits Djedkare with 28 years of reign.

In addition to these sources, Djedkare is mentioned on the Prisse Papyrus dating to the 12th Dynasty (c. 1990–1800 BC). The papyrus records The Maxims of Ptahhotep and gives Djedkare's nomen "Isesi" to name the pharaoh whom the purported authors of the maxims, vizier Ptahhotep, served. Djedkare was also probably mentioned in the Aegyptiaca, a history of Egypt written in the 3rd century BC during the reign of Ptolemy II (283–246 BC) by the Egyptian priest Manetho. No copies of the Aegyptiaca have survived to this day and it is known to us only through later writings by Sextus Julius Africanus and Eusebius. Africanus relates that a pharaoh Tancheres (Ancient Greek Τανχέρης) reigned for 44 years as the eighth and penultimate king of the Fifth Dynasty. Given its position within the dynasty, Tancheres is believed to be his Hellenized name.

== Family ==
=== Parents ===
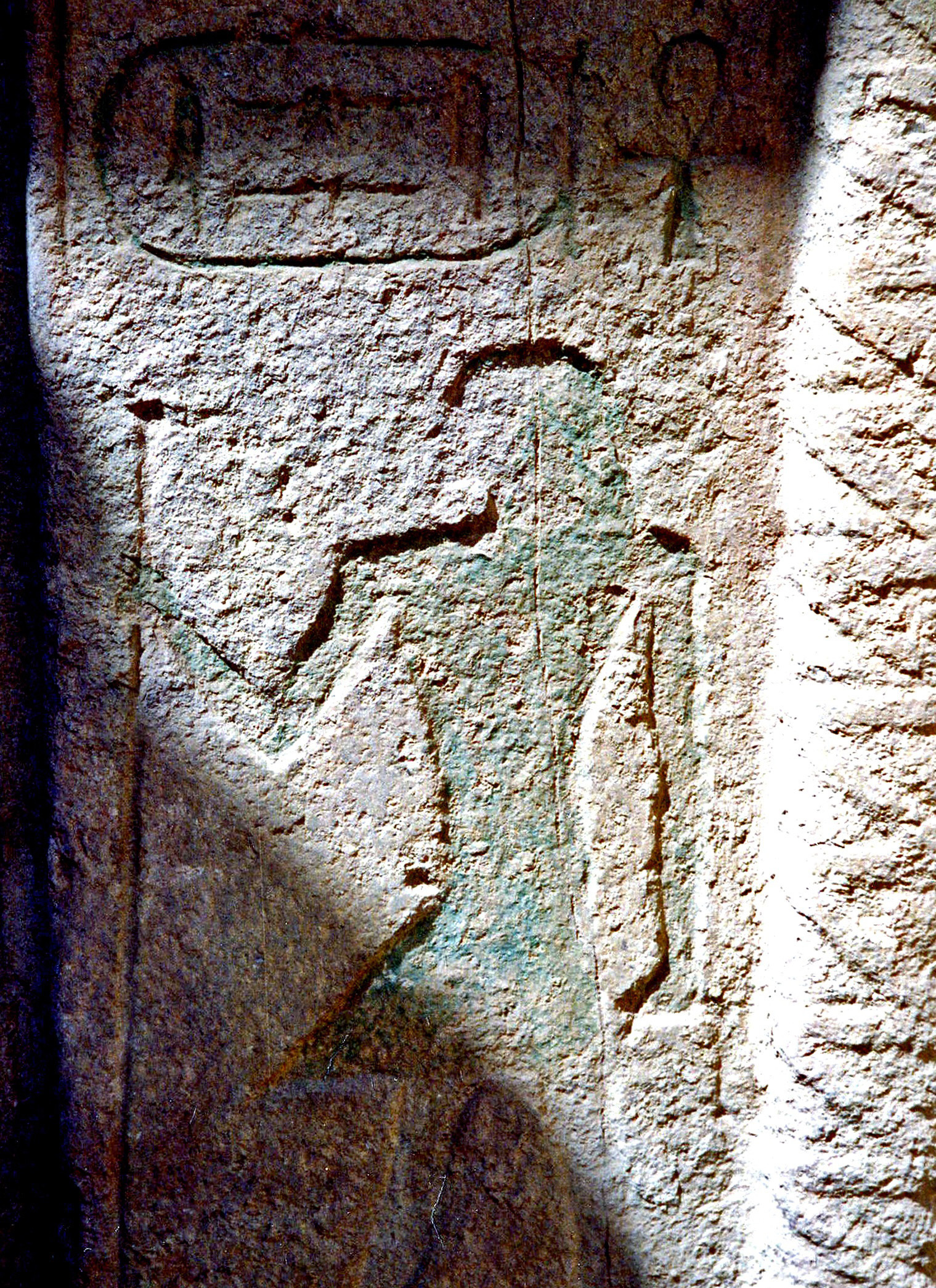
Isesi-ankh as depicted on his false door stela

Djedkare's parentage is unknown; in particular his relation with his predecessors Menkauhor Kaiu and Nyuserre Ini cannot be ascertained. Djedkare is generally thought to have been the son of Menkauhor Kaiu, but the two might instead have been brothers and sons of Nyuserre Ini. Another hypothesis suggests that Djedkare and Menkauhor could have been cousins, being sons of Nyuserre and Neferefre respectively. The identity of Djedkare's mother is similarly unknown.

=== Queens ===
The name of Djedkare's principal wife was Setibhor. This important queen consort whose name was lost but found in 2019 was the owner of a large pyramid complex located to the northeast of Djedkare's pyramid in Saqqara. This could indicate that she was the mother of Djedkare's successor, Unas, or that Djedkare owed the throne to her. The very high status of this queen is suggested by some features of her funerary complex that are otherwise reserved to kings: her pyramid has its own satellite pyramid, has a causeway leading from a valley temple up to a mortuary temple devoted to the cult of the queen and had an entrance hall pr-wrw, an open courtyard and a square antechamber. Furthermore, some reliefs showing the queen had been reworked with royal insignia and vultures added above her head. Since the construction of the queen's pyramid was apparently undertaken after the planning of Djedkare's pyramid and her relief had been reworked, the Egyptologist Klaus Baer suggests that this queen may have ruled after the death of Djedkare, playing an important role in his succession. This is rejected by other Egyptologists, such as Michel Baud, owing to the lack of evidence for a regency or interregnum between Djedkare and Unas.

The Egyptologist Wilfried Seipel has proposed that this pyramid was initially intended for queen Meresankh IV, whom he and Verner see as a wife of Djedkare. Seipel contends that Meresankh was finally buried in a smaller mastaba in Saqqara North after she fell into disgrace. Alternatively, Aidan Dodson and Dyan Hilton have proposed that she was a wife of the preceding king, Menkauhor Kaiu.

=== Sons ===
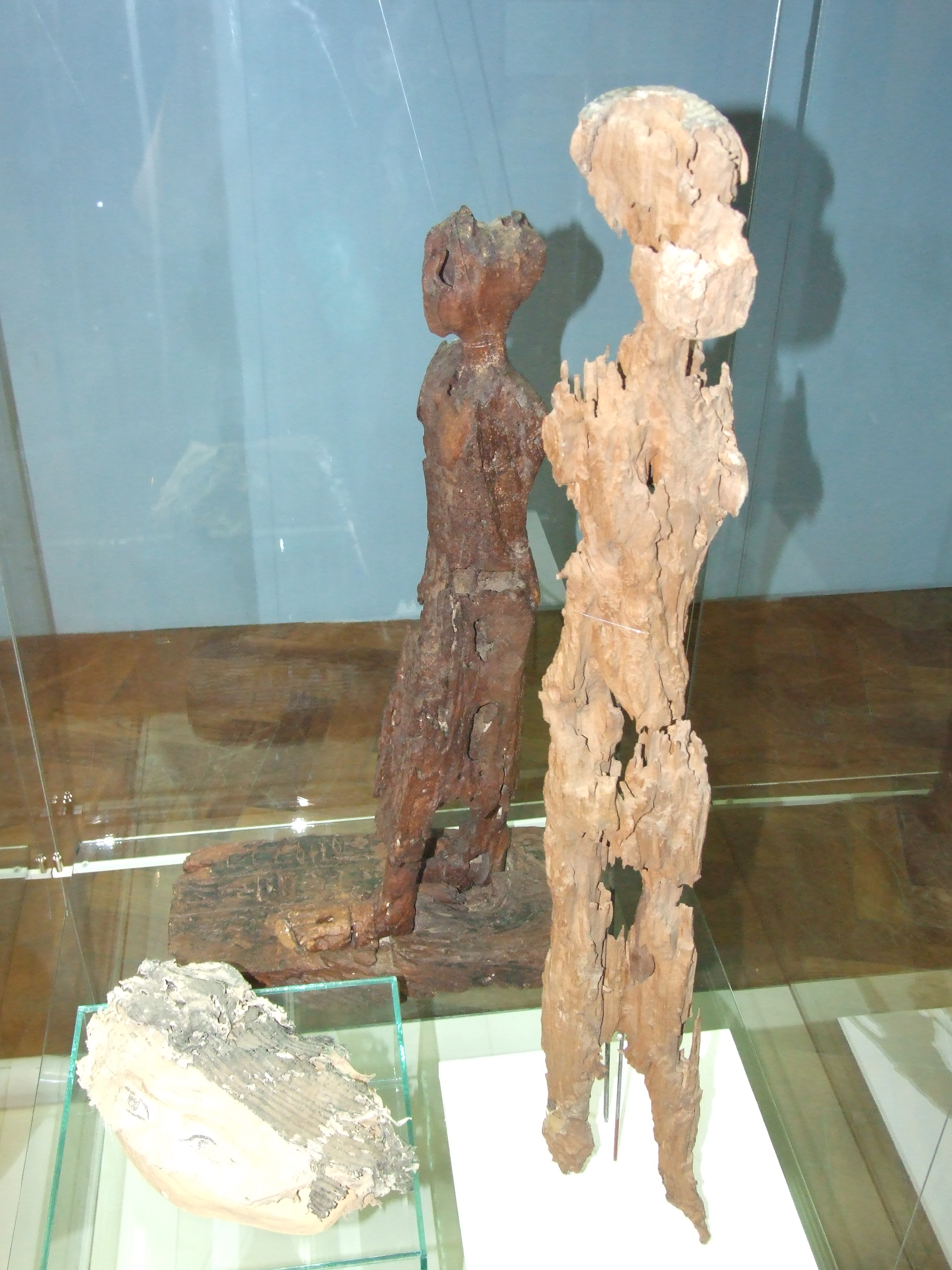
Wooden statues of Kekheretnebti and in the background, of Neserkauhor, now in the Náprstek Museum

Only one son of Djedkare has been identified for certain, Neserkauhor, who bore the title of "eldest beloved king's son of his body". (Note: Neserkauhor was buried in mastaba C, south of Nyuserre's pyramid complex in the east of the Abusir necropolis.) Neserkauhor also bore the title of Iry-pat, showing that he was an important member of the royal court, as well as a priestly title "Greatest of the Five in the temple of Thoth", suggesting that he may have been a vizier or had similar occupations.

As well as Neserkauhor, there is indirect evidence that princes Raemka (Note: Prince Raemka was buried in the mastaba tomb S80, also known as mastaba D3 and QS 903, in Saqqara, north of Djoser's pyramid. His tomb seems to have been usurped from a certain Neferiretnes. The chapel from Raemka's tomb is now on display in the Metropolitan Museum of Art.) and Kaemtjenent (Note: Prince Kaemtjenent was buried in the mastaba tomb S84 in Saqqara.) are sons of Djedkare based on the dating and general location of their tombs in Saqqara. For example, the tomb of Kaemtjenent mentions vizier Rashepses, who served during the reign of Djedkare. Raemka also bore the title of "king's son of his body", almost exclusively reserved to true princes of royal blood. (Note: As opposed to those bearing the title "king's son", which was used as an honorary title during the later Fifth Dynasty.) The locations of Raemka's and Kaemtjenent's tombs have led some Egyptologists to believe that both princes are sons of queen Meresankh IV buried nearby, who would thus be one of Djedkare's wives. These conclusions are debated, in particular in the case of Kaemtjenent, whose title of "king's son" may have been purely honorific.

A high official named Isesi-ankh could have been yet another son of Djedkare, as suggested by his name meaning "Isesi lives". Yet, similarities in the titles and locations of the tombs (Note: Isesi-ankh was buried in mastaba D8, north of the pyramid of Djoser in Saqqara.) of Isesi-ankh and Kaemtjenent have led Egyptologists to propose that they could instead be brothers and sons of Meresankh IV, or that the former is a son of the latter. Even though Isesi-ankh bore the title of "king's son", the Egyptologists Michel Baud and Bettina Schmitz argue that this filiation was fictitious, being only an honorary title.

Finally, the successor of Djedkare, Unas, is thought to have been his son in spite of the complete lack of evidence bearing on the question. The main argument in favor of this filiation is that the succession from Djedkare to Unas seems to have been smooth, as suggested indirectly, for example, by the Abusir papyri. Indirect evidence also comes from the reliefs of Unas' causeway, which show many officials bearing names incorporating "Isesi", suggesting at the very least that Unas did not perceive Djedkare as an antagonist.

=== Daughters ===
Several daughters of Djedkare have been identified by the title of "king's daughter of his body" and the general date of their tomb. These include Kekheretnebti, (Note: Kekheretnebti is believed to have died in her early thirties, she was buried in mastaba B in east Abusir, south of the pyramid complex of Nyuserre. She had a daughter named Tisethor, who was buried in an extension of her tomb.) whose filiation is clearly indicated by her other title of "Beloved of Isesi", Meret-Isesi, (Note: Probably buried in Abusir.) Hedjetnebu, (Note: Buried in the mastaba K, south of Nyuserre's complex in Abusir, likely prior to the building of Tisethor's tomb.) and Nebtyemneferes. (Note: Buried in Abusir.) Less certain is the filiation of Kentkhaus, wife of vizier Senedjemib Mehi, who bore the title of "king's daughter of his body". It is debated whether this title indicates a true filiation or if it is only honorary.

== Chronology ==
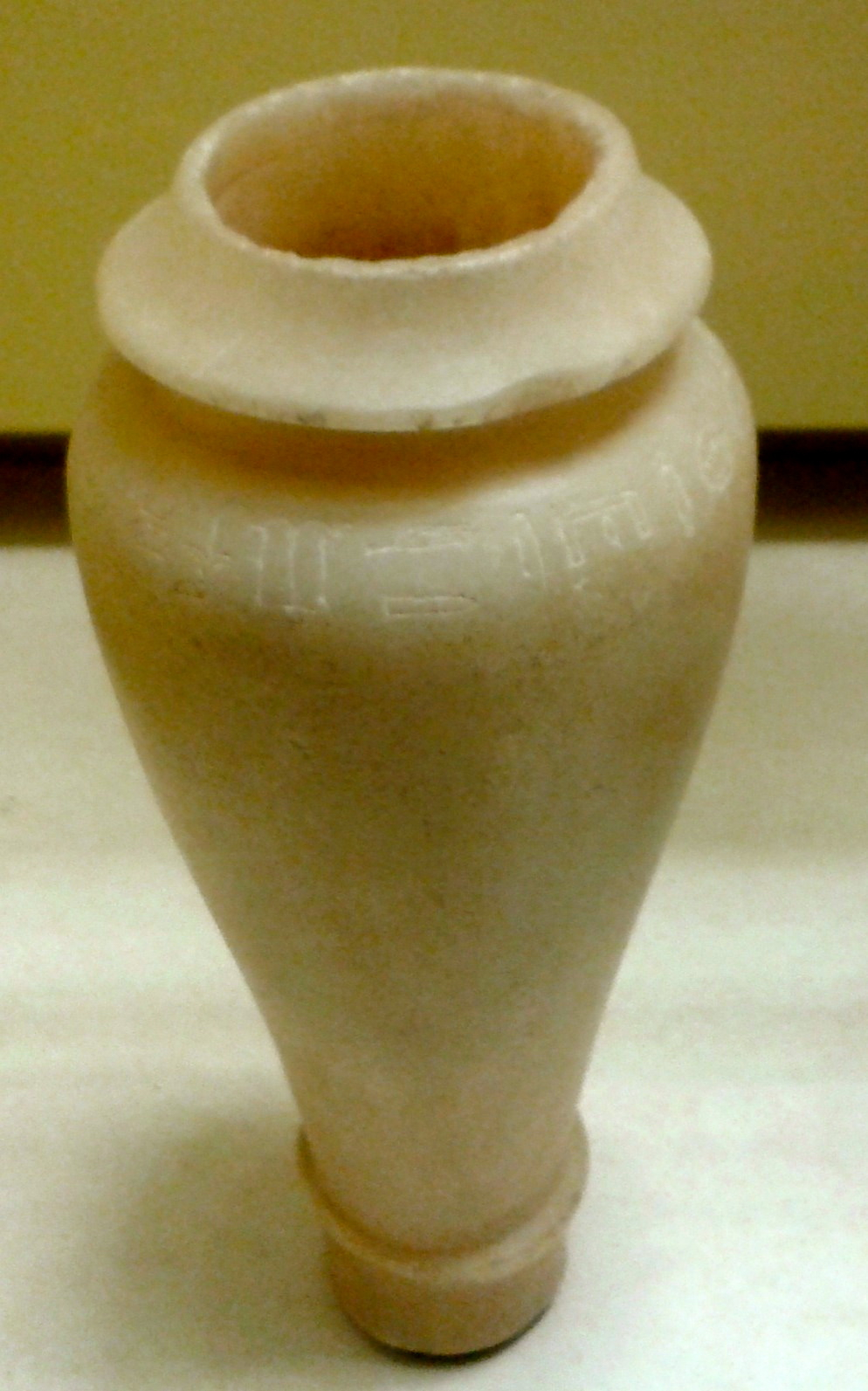
Alabaster vase bearing an inscription celebrating Djedkare's first "Sed" festival, Musée du Louvre (Note: The inscription reads "First occasion of the Sed festival of the king of Upper and Lower Egypt Djedkare, beloved of the bas of Heliopolis, given life, stability, and all joy for ever.")

The relative chronological position of Djedkare as the eighth and penultimate ruler of the Fifth Dynasty, succeeding Menkauhor Kaiu and preceding Unas on the throne, is well established by historical sources and confirmed by archaeological evidence.

The duration of Djedkare's reign is much less certain. Djedkare's time on the throne is well documented by the Abusir papyri, numerous royal seals and contemporary inscriptions; taken together, they indicate a fairly long rule for this king. (Note: The years of 1st, 3rd, 4th, 5th, 6th, 8th, 9th, 10th, 11th, 14th, 15th, 16th, 17th, 18th and 22nd cattle counts are attested in contemporary sources for Djedkare.) While the Turin canon credits him with 28 years of reign, there is direct evidence for an even longer reign. Several artefacts and inscriptions have been uncovered relating to Djedkare's rejuvenation or "sed" festival, normally celebrated only after 30 years of reign. For example, the tomb of one of Djedkare's viziers, Senedjemib Inti, relates construction works undertaken during the year of the 16th cattle count in preparation for the festival ceremonies. An alabaster vase now on display at the Louvre museum (Note: Catalog number E5323.) bears an inscription celebrating Djedkare's first sed festival, indicating in all likelihood that he reigned beyond his 30th year on the throne.

One of the Abusir papyri was found to be dated to the "Year of the 22nd Count, IV Akhet day 12", constituting Djedkare's latest known date. (Note: Miroslav Verner writes that Paule Posener-Kriéger and Jean-Louis de Cenival transcribed the year date numeral in the papyrus as the "year of the 21st count" in their 1968 study of the Abusir papyri. Verner notes that in "the damaged place where the numeral still is, one can see a tiny black trace of another vertical stroke just visible. Therefore, the numeral can probably be reconstructed as 22.) This date might correspond to any time from the 32nd year of Djedkare's reign up to his 44th year on the throne, depending on whether the cattle count was once every two years or once every year and a half. The higher estimate is close to Manetho's 44-year figure credited to Tancheres, the Hellenized name of Djedkare, although this may just be coincidental. Modern estimates thus put Djedkare's reign length as certainly more than 33 years and, if the cattle count was regularly biennial, at least 42 to 44 years. This makes Djedkare the longest reigning king of the Fifth Dynasty.

== Reign ==
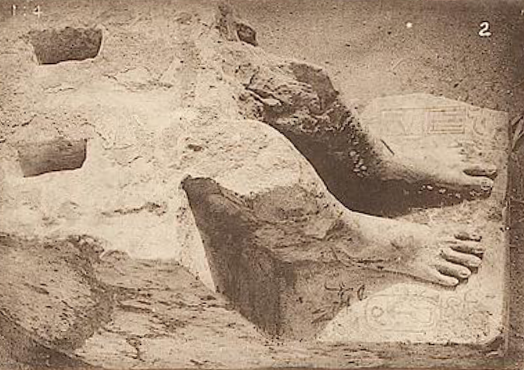
Statue of Djedkare from the temple of Osiris in Abydos

The reign of Djedkare heralded a new period in the history of the Old Kingdom. First, he did not build a sun temple, as his predecessors had done since the time of Userkaf, some 80 years earlier. (Note: With the possible exception of Shepseskare who might not have the time required to start one.) This may be a result of the increased prominence of Osiris compared with the sun god Ra during the late Fifth Dynasty. The rise of Osiris corresponds to changes in the role of the king with respect to the wider Egyptian society. In particular, the king loses his role as the sole guarantor of the afterlife, which now becomes available beyond the immediate royal circle. These changes demythologise the king's position and, as the Egyptologist Hans Goedicke writes, make him fully human yet still socially dominant. The importance of the cult of Osiris becomes manifest when the Pyramid Texts of the pyramid of Unas are inscribed a few decades later. In this context, it is perhaps noteworthy that the only known statue of Djedkare was discovered in the ruins of the temple of Osiris, in Abydos. Another manifestation of the winds of change during Djedkare's time on the throne is the confirmation of the relocation of the royal necropolis from Abusir, where it had been since the reign of Sahure, to Saqqara, where Menkauhor Kaiu, Djedkare and his successor, Unas, built their pyramids. Abusir may have become overcrowded by the time of Menkauhor's accession and the capital may have been shifted south to Saqqara, along with the royal necropolis, around the same time. The abandonment of Abusir as a royal necropolis and the termination of sun temple building are possibly related, given the close association between the two since the reign of Userkaf.

=== Domestic reforms ===
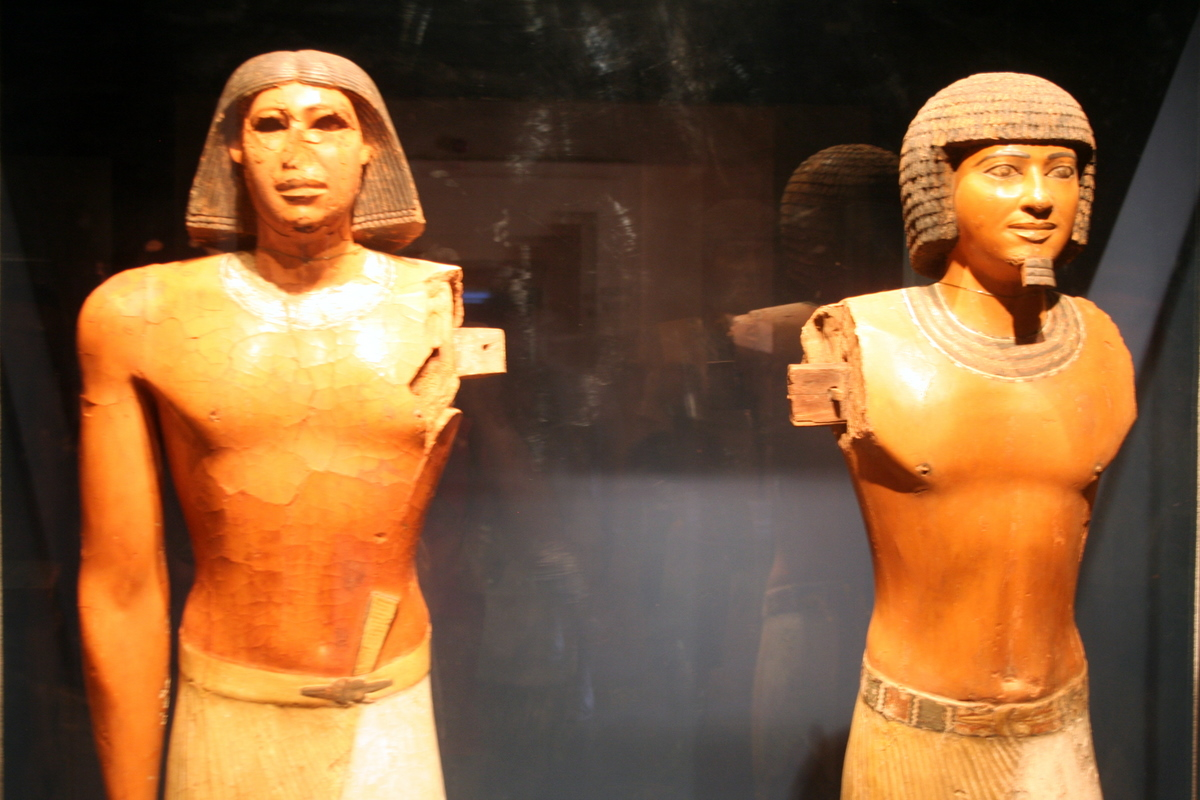
Two statues of Ptahhotep, a vizier during Djedkare's reign

During his reign Djedkare effected significant reforms of the state administration and priesthood, in particular that pertaining to the funerary cults in the necropolis of Abusir. (Note: The abandonment of Abusir as the royal necropolis meant that Djedkare had to strictly regulate its activities so as to ensure the proper continuation of the funerary cults taking place there, which explains in large part the administrative content of the Abusir papyri.) These evolutions are witnessed by changes in priestly titles and more broadly, in the system of ranking titles of high officials, which was modified for the first time in its existence. For example, the priesthood of the royal pyramids was reorganized, with Djedkare possibly changing the titles and functions of the priests from "priest of king" to "priest of the pyramid", although this change may have happened earlier, under Nyuserre Ini. Princes of royal blood could once more hold administrative titles, (Note: The Egyptologist Nigel Strudwick illustrates this novelty with the cases of Isesi-ankh and Kaemtjenent, who both bore the title of "king's son" as well as a number of administrative titles such as "overseer of all the works of the king" and "seal bearer of the god". The Egyptologists Michel Baud and Bettina Schmitz have argued that the title of "king's son" here does not denote a true filiation and was only honorary, at least in the case of Isesi-ankh. More generally Baud and Schmitz consider that true princes of blood were qualified of smsw [z3 nswt] for "eldest [king's son]" and remained excluded from holding administrative offices.) a prerogative they had lost during the early Fifth Dynasty. At the same time, viziers could now hold the prestigious titles of Iry-pat and Haty-a and, as "overseer of the royal scribes", became the head of the scribal administration. At least one vizier, Seshemnefer III, even bore the title of "king's son of his body", one of the most distinguished titles at the time and normally reserved to princes of royal blood. Yet neither Seshemnefer III's father nor his mother seems to have belonged to the royal family. For the period spanning the reign of Djedkare until that of Teti, viziers were furthermore responsible for the weaponry of the state, both for military and other purposes. Following the reforms undertaken by Djedkare, three viziers would be in office at the same time: two in the Memphite region and a Southern one, the "governor of Upper Egypt", with a seat at Abydos. In total six viziers were appointed during Djedkare's reign. (Note: These are Ptahhotep Desher, Seshemnefer III, Ptahhotep, Rashepses, another Ptahhotep, and Senedjemib Inti.)

Lower ranking officials lost power during the late Fifth Dynasty and were frequently limited to holding only one high title, a departure from the preceding period. Such functions as "overseer of the granary" and "overseer of the treasury" disappear from the record some time between Djedkare's reign and that of Teti, while men of lower status became head of the legal administration. Consequently, the viziers concentrated more power than before while lower echelons of the state administration were reduced. At the same time, the size of the provincial administration was increased, and it also became more autonomous from the central government. In particular, the nomarchs were responsible in their provinces for performing works hitherto conducted by Memphite officials.

=== Building activities ===
The main building activity undertaken during the reign of Djedkare was the construction of his pyramid complex in Saqqara. Djedkare also either completed or undertook restoration works in the funerary complex of Nyuserre Ini in Abusir, as indicated by a now damaged inscription, which must have detailed Djedkare's activities on the site. (Note: The block inscribed with the text relating Djedkare's works in the temple of Nyuserre reads "Horus Djedkhau, the king of Upper and Lower Egypt, the Two Ladies Djedkhau, the Golden Horus Djed, Djedkare. For the king of Upper and Lower Egypt [Nyuse]rre he set up a monument ...". It is now in the Egyptian Museum of Berlin, catalog No. 17933.) Further building works took place in Abusir during the second half of Djedkare's reign following the curious decision by members of the royal family to be buried there rather than next to Djedkare's pyramid in Saqqara. A group of mastabas was thus constructed for princess Kekheretnebti and her daughter Tisethor, princess Hedjetnebu, the courtiers Mernefu and Idu, who was buried with his wife Khenit, and prince Neserkauhor.

Djedkare also undertook building activities in relation with his "sed" festival as indicated by a decree that he sent to his vizier Senedjemib Inti on the year of the 16th cattle count, praising him for his work. The decree mentions the construction of a broad rectangular court or artificial lake for the jubilee of the king, some 1000 cubits long and 400 cubits wide, amounting to c. 525 m × 231 m (1,722 ft × 758 ft). The court was located within the precincts of a palace built for the ceremonies of the "sed" festival, which was probably located in the vicinity of his pyramid. (Note: The name of the palace mentioned in the decree has been the subject of varying translations owing to the damaged state of the inscription. For Brovarski and Sethe the palace is simply called the "jubilee palace" in the decree, while others such as Breasted, Roccati, and Trigger have read the palace name as "lotus-blossom of Isesi" or "lotus of Isesi" (Ancient Egyptian Nehbet). Wente reads the "jubilee palace of Lotus-of-Izezi".) Another decree addressed to Senedjemib Inti and later inscribed on the walls of his mastaba records the decoration of a chapel of Hathor in the palace of the king. This chapel was most likely built during his reign.

Djedkare may have left some of his monuments unfinished at his death, as suggested by several relief-bearing blocks inscribed with his name and which were found reused in the pyramid of king Unas. Their original setting remains unknown. A reused granite block with the king's name was also found at the pyramid of Amenemhat I at Lisht.

=== Activities outside Egypt ===
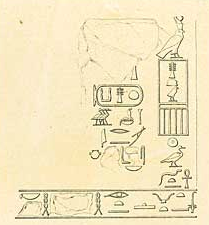
Drawing by Karl Richard Lepsius of a relief of Djedkare, Wadi Maghara

==== Expeditions to mines and quarries ====
Three or four (Note: It is unclear whether two of the inscribed texts originate from the same damaged inscription or have always been part of two different inscriptions.) rock inscriptions dating to Djedkare's reign have been found in the Wadi Maghareh in Sinai, where mines of copper and semi-precious stones were exploited throughout the Old Kingdom, from the Fourth until the Sixth Dynasty. These inscriptions record three expeditions sent to look for turquoise: the earliest one, dated to the third or fourth cattle count–possibly corresponding to the sixth or eighth year of Dejdkare's reign–explicitly recalls the arrival of the mining party to the "hills of the turquoise" (Note: Also translated as "terraces of turquoise" from the Egyptian ḫtjw mfk3t.) after being given "divine authority for the finding of semi-precious stones in the writing of the god himself, [as was enacted] in the broad court of the temple Nekhenre". This sentence could indicate the earliest known record of an oracular divination undertaken in order to ensure the success of the expedition prior to its departure, Nekhenre being the sun temple of Userkaf. Another inscription dating to the year of the ninth cattle count–possibly Djedkare's 18th year on the throne – shows the king "subduing all foreign lands. Smiting the chief of the foreign land". The expedition that left this inscription comprised over 1400 men and administration officials. Some Egyptologists have proposed that these men were also sent to mine copper.

These expeditions departed Egypt from the port of Ain Sukhna, on the western shore of the Gulf of Suez, as revealed by papyri and seals bearing Djedkare's name found on the site. The port comprised large galleries carved into the sandstone serving as living quarters and storage places. The wall of one such gallery was inscribed with a text mentioning yet another expedition to the hills of turquoise in the year of the seventh cattle count–possibly Djedkare's 14th year on the throne. In early 2018, more than 220 clay seals bearing the serekh of Djedkare were uncovered in Tell Edfu in the south of Upper Egypt. These seals have been found in close association with copper ore, Nubian pottery, the remains of two large buildings and a settlement. Edfu, called Behdet by the ancient Egyptians, was likely the place of departure for the mining expeditions sent to the Eastern desert and the Red Sea during Djedkare's reign. These expeditions were undertaken by a special group of prospectors, called the sementiu, who were under the orders of an administration official sent by the king from Memphis to Edfu.

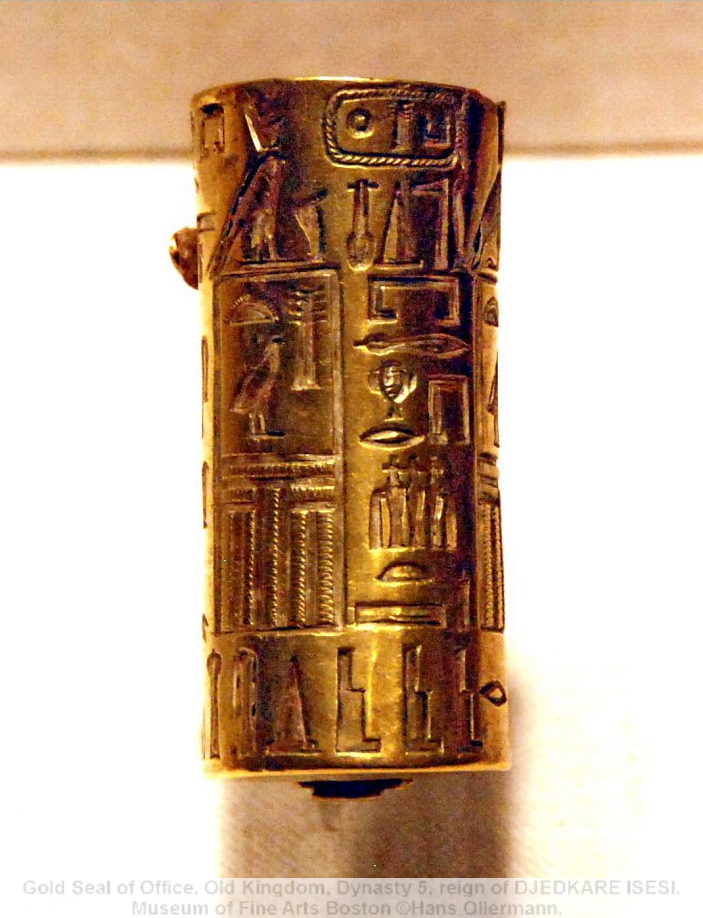
Gold cylinder seal bearing the names of Djedkare and Menkauhor Kaiu, purportedly from Anatolia

South of Egypt, Djedkare dispatched at least one expedition to the diorite quarries located 65 km (40 mi) north-west of Abu Simbel. (Note: The rock exploited in these quarries actually comprises two varieties of gneiss, the word "diorite" being misused by Egyptologists to designate these.) Djedkare was not the first king to do so, as these quarries were already exploited during the Fourth Dynasty and continued to be so during the Sixth Dynasty and later, in the Middle Kingdom period (c. 2055 BC – c. 1650 BC).

Djedkare probably also exploited gold mines in the Eastern Desert and in Nubia: indeed, the earliest mention of the "land of gold" – an Ancient Egyptian term for Nubia (Note: Gold is Nub in Ancient Egyptian, and the "land of gold" may have given rise to the modern word "Nubia") – is found in an inscription from the mortuary temple of Djedkare.

==== Trade relations ====
Egypt entertained continuing trade relations with the Levant during Djedkare's reign, possibly as far north as Anatolia. A gold cylinder seal bearing the serekh of Djedkare together with the cartouche of Menkauhor Kaiu is now on display at the Museum of Fine Arts, Boston. (Note: The golden seal has the catalog number 68.115.) The seal, whose gold may originate from the Pactolus river valley in western Anatolia, could attest to wide-ranging trade-contacts during the later Fifth Dynasty, but its provenance remains unverifiable. (Note: The provenance of the seal is usually believed to be a tomb in a yet undiscovered site along the Eastern Mediterranean coast. The archaeologist Karin Sowada doubts the authenticity of the seal.)

Trade contacts with Byblos, on the coast of modern-day Lebanon, are suggested by a fragmentary stone vessel unearthed in the city and bearing the inscription "King of Upper and Lower Egypt, Djedkare [living] forever". A biographical inscription discovered in the tomb of Iny, a Sixth Dynasty official, provides further evidence for an Egyptian expedition to Byblos during Djedkare's reign. Iny's inscription relates his travels to procure lapis lazuli and lead or tin for pharaoh Merenre, but starts by recounting what must have been similar events taking place under Djedkare.

To the south of Egypt, Djedkare also sent an expedition to the fabled Land of Punt to procure the myrrh used as incense in the Egyptian temples. The expedition to Punt is referred to in the letter from Pepi II Neferkare to Harkuf some 100 years later. Harkuf had reported that he would bring back a "dwarf of the god's dancers from the land of the horizon dwellers". Pepi mentions that the god's sealbearer Werdjededkhnum had returned from Punt with a dwarf during the reign of Djedkare and had been richly rewarded. The decree mentions that "My Majesty will do for you something greater than what was done for the god's sealbearer Werdjededkhnum in the reign of Isesi, reflecting my majesty's yearning to see this dwarf".

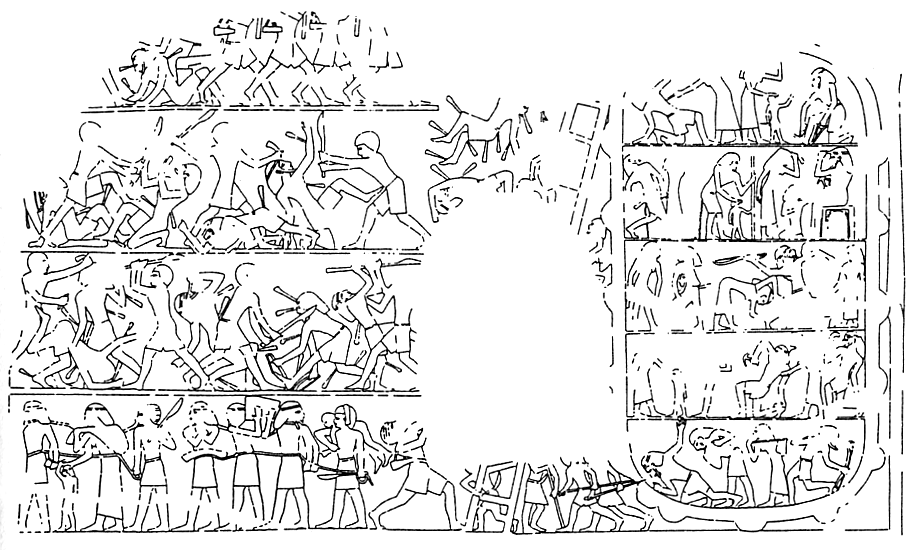
Relief from the tomb of Inti showing a scene of battle or siege

Djedkare's expedition to Punt is also mentioned in a contemporaneous graffito found in Tumas, a locality of Lower Nubia some 150 km (93 mi) south of Aswan, where Isesi's cartouche was discovered.

==== Warfare ====
Not all relations between Egypt and its neighbors were peaceful during Djedkare's reign. In particular, one of the earliest known depictions of a battle or a city being besieged is found in the tomb of Inti, an official from the 21st nome of Upper Egypt, who lived during the late Fifth Dynasty. The scene shows Egyptian soldiers scaling the walls of a Near Eastern fortress on ladders. More generally, ancient Egyptians seem to have regularly organised punitive raids in Canaan during the later Old Kingdom period but did not attempt to establish a permanent dominion there.

== Pyramid ==
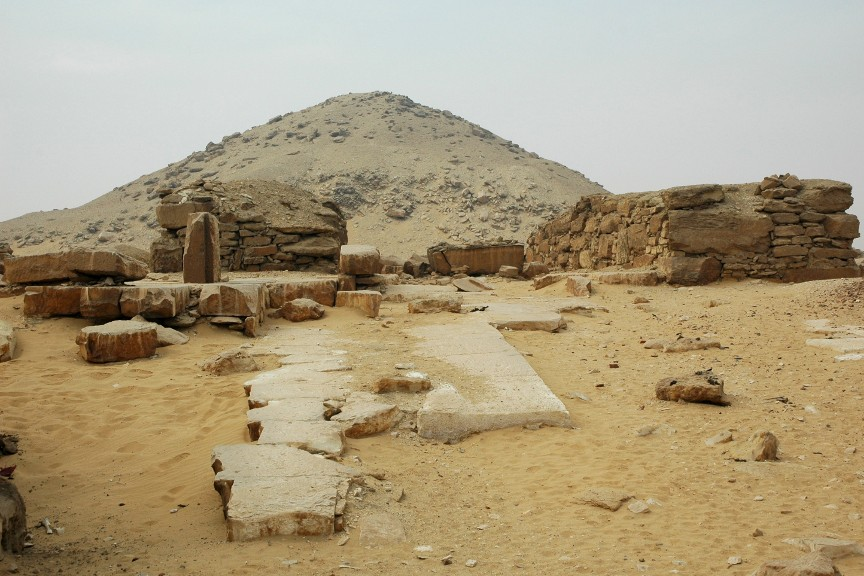
The pyramid of Djedkare in Saqqara

Djedkare built his pyramid in South Saqqara. It was called Nefer Isesi or Nefer Djedkare in Ancient Egyptian, (Note: Transliterations nfr-Jzzj and nfr-Ḏd-k3-Rˁ.) variously translated as "Isesi/Djedkare is beautiful" or "Isesi/Djedkare is perfect". It is known today as Haram el-Shawwâf (Arabic: هَـرَم ٱلـشَّـوَّاف, romanized: Haram ash-Shawwāf, lit. 'The Sentinel Pyramid'), because it stands on the edge of the Nile valley.

The pyramid originally comprised six or seven steps made of irregular and roughly hewn limestone blocks and mortar, of which only three survive. This core was overlaid by casing stones of white Tura limestone, which were stolen in antiquity. At the time of its construction the pyramid stood 52 m (171 ft) high, with a base length of 78.75 m (258.4 ft) and an inclination angle of 52°.

In the interior of the pyramid a descending passage led, behind three granite portcullises, to an antechamber, three magazine rooms and the burial chamber. In the burial chamber, pieces of alabaster and a faience bead on a gold thread were discovered, as well as many fragments of what was originally a large sarcophagus of dark grey basalt. The sarcophagus was sunk into the floor of the burial chamber and there was a niche for the canopic chest of the king to its north-east. An almost complete mummy was discovered in the remnants of the sarcophagus. An examination by Ahmed Batrawi of these skeletal remains, excavated in the mid-1940s under the direction of Abdel-Salam Hussein, suggests that Djedkare died at the age of 50 to 60 years.

To the east of the pyramid, Djedkare's mortuary temple was laid out. Its eastern façade was flanked by two massive stone structures, which resemble the later pylons. The mortuary temple is connected via a yet unexcavated causeway to a valley temple.

== Legacy ==
=== Impact of the reforms ===
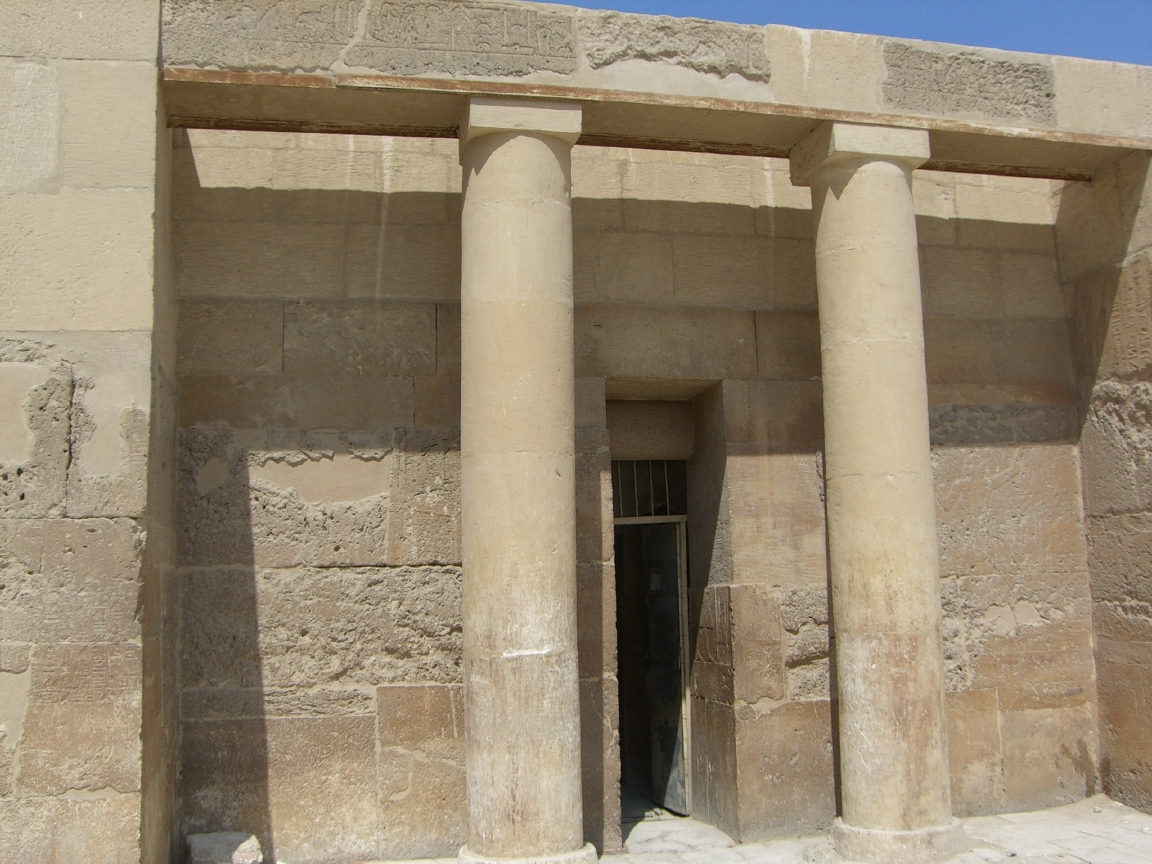
The large mastaba of Senedjemib Inti, vizier under Djedkare

For Nigel Strudwick, the reforms of Djedkare were undertaken as a reaction to the rapid growth of the central administration in the first part of the Fifth Dynasty which, Baer adds, had amassed too much political or economic power in the eyes of the king. Joyce Tyldesley sees the reign of Djedkare as the very beginning of a decline in the importance of the king, in conjunction with the gradual rise of the power wielded by the high and provincial administration. Concurrent with this trend is a process of decentralization, with local loyalties slowly superseding allegiance to the central state. Since offices and the vizierate in particular could be inherited, the reforms of Djedkare created a "virtual feudal system" as Nicolas Grimal writes, with much power in the hands of a few puissant officials. This is best witnessed by the large, magnificent mastaba tombs that Djedkare's viziers built. In this context, Djedkare's reforms of the ranking system might have been an attempt at maintaining a sprawling administration under control, yet ultimately failed. For some Egyptologists, such as Naguib Kanawati, this failure contributed in no small part to the fall of the Old Kingdom, but others, including Strudwick, believe the reasons of the collapse must be sought elsewhere as the power of an administration official never approached that of the king.

The reforms of Djedkare played an important role in flourishing of the arts during the later Old Kingdom, as artisans and craftsmen could now find many wealthy patrons beyond the king. This created a surge in the number of commissions leading to a general improvement of the artistic works. This also provided the artisans with a new wealth, which they used to build their own large funerary complexes.

=== Funerary cult ===
==== Old Kingdom ====
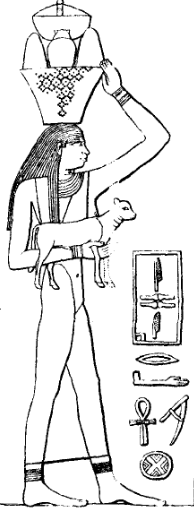
Personified agricultural estate of Djedkare called "Ra desires that Isesi lives"

Djedkare was the object of a funerary cult established at his death and which lasted until the end of the Old Kingdom nearly 200 years later. Provisions for this cult were produced in several agricultural estates set up during Djedkare's reign. The names of some of these estates have been found inscribed on the walls of the tombs of his courtiers: "Ra desires that Isesi lives", (Note: Ancient Egyptian Mr-Rˁ-ˁnḫ-Izzi, tomb of Ptahhotep II, Saqqara.) "Heqa desires that Izezi live", (Note: Ancient Egyptian Mr-Ḥq3-ˁnḫ-Izzi.) "Perfect of emulation is Isesi", (Note: Ancient Egyptian Nfr-nḥrw-Izzi.) "The mnza-vessel of Djedkare", (Note: Ancient Egyptian Mnz3-Ḏd-k3-Rˁ.) "Perfect of favors is Isesi", (Note: Ancient Egyptian Nfr-ḥzwt-Izzi.) "Seshat makes Isesi live", (Note: Ancient Egyptian Sˁnḫ-Sš3t-Izzi.) "The Ka of Isesi is foremost", (Note: Ancient Egyptian ḫnty-k3-Izzi.) "Dominion belongs to Izezi", (Note: Ancient Egyptian N(y)-w3s-Izzi.) "Work of the command of Izezi", (Note: Ancient Egyptian Irt-wḏt-Izzi.) "Bastet wishes that Izezi lives", (Note: Ancient Egyptian Mr B3stt-ˁnḫ-Izzi.) "Horus perpetuates Izezi", (Note: Ancient Egyptian Srwḏ-Ḥr-Izzi.) "The offerings of Izezi", (Note: Ancient Egyptian Ḥtpwt-Izzi.) and "Izezi is one who loves life". (Note: Ancient Egyptian Mr ˁnḫ-Izzi.)

Djedkare seems to have been held in high esteem during the Sixth Dynasty. For example, Merenre Nemtyemsaf I chose to place his pyramid complex close to that of Djedkare. In addition, the South Saqqara Stone, a royal annal dating to the reign of Merenre or of his successor Pepi II, records rich offerings being made to Djedkare on behalf of the king. (Note: See in particular the zone F6 of the Saqqara stone.) An estimated 92% of the text inscribed on the stone was lost when it was roughly polished to be reused as a sarcophagus lid, possibly in the late First Intermediate (c. 2160–2055 BC) to early Middle Kingdom period (c. 2055–1650 BC).

More generally, an historical or literary tradition concerning events in the time of Djedkare seems to have flourished toward the end of Old Kingdom as can be inferred from the tombs of Harkuf and Iny. These two officials were in charge of expeditions to foreign lands–Punt and Byblos– under Merenre I and Pepi II and both relate similar expeditions that took place during the time of Djedkare.

==== New Kingdom ====
The funerary cult of Djedkare enjoyed a revival during the New Kingdom (c. 1550–1077 BC). For the early part of this period, this is best attested by the Karnak king list, a list of kings commissioned by pharaoh Thutmose III. The list was not meant to be exhaustive, rather it gave the names of Thutmose's forefathers whom he wanted to honor by dedicating offerings.

For the later New Kingdom, a relief from the Saqqara tomb of the priest Mehu, dating to the 19th or 20th Dynasty shows three gods faced by several deceased pharaohs. These are Djoser and Sekhemket, of the Third Dynasty and Userkaf, founder of the Fifth Dynasty. He is followed by a fourth king whose name is damaged but which is often read "Djedkare" or, much less likely, "Shepseskare". The relief is an expression of personal piety on Mehu's behalf, who prayed to the ancient kings for them to recommend him to the gods.

== See also ==
- List of pharaohs

== Bibliography ==
- Allen, James; Allen, Susan; Anderson, Julie; Arnold, Arnold; Arnold, Dorothea; Cherpion, Nadine; David, Élisabeth; Grimal, Nicolas; Grzymski, Krzysztof; Hawass, Zahi; Hill, Marsha; Jánosi, Peter; Labée-Toutée, Sophie; Labrousse, Audran; Lauer, Jean-Phillippe; Leclant, Jean; Der Manuelian, Peter; Millet, N. B.; Oppenheim, Adela; Craig Patch, Diana; Pischikova, Elena; Rigault, Patricia; Roehrig, Catharine H.; Wildung, Dietrich; Ziegler, Christiane (1999). Egyptian Art in the Age of the Pyramids. New York: The Metropolitan Museum of Art. ISBN 978-0-8109-6543-0. OCLC 41431623.
- Altenmüller, Hartwig (1990). "Bemerkungen zur Gründung der 6. Dynastie". Hildesheimer Ägyptologische Beiträge. Festschrift Jürgen von Beckerath zum 70. Geburtstag am 19. Februar 1990 (in German). 30. Hildesheim: Pelizaeus-Museum: 1–20.
- Altenmüller, Hartwig (2001). "Old Kingdom: Fifth Dynasty". In Redford, Donald B. (ed.). The Oxford Encyclopedia of Ancient Egypt, Volume 2. Oxford University Press. pp. 597–601. ISBN 978-0-19-510234-5.
- Andrassy, Petra (2008). Untersuchungen zum ägyptischen Staat des Alten Reiches und seinen Institutionen (PDF). Internet-Beiträge zur Ägyptologie und Sudanarchäologie, 11 (in German). Berlin; London: Golden House Publications. ISBN 978-1-906137-08-3. Archived from the original (PDF) on 2018-03-28.
- Baer, Klaus (1960). Rank and Title in the Old Kingdom. Chicago: University of Chicago Press. ISBN 978-0-226-03412-6.
- Baker, Darrell (2008). The Encyclopedia of the Pharaohs: Volume I – Predynastic to the Twentieth Dynasty 3300–1069 BC. Stacey International. ISBN 978-1-905299-37-9.
- Batrawi, Ahmed (1947). "The Pyramid Studies. Anatomical Reports". Annales du Service des Antiquités de l'Égypte. 47. Institut français d'archéologie orientale du Caire: 97–111.
- Baud, Michel; Dobrev, Vassil (1995). "De nouvelles annales de l'Ancien Empire Egyptien. Une "Pierre de Palerme" pour la VIe dynastie" (PDF). Bulletin de l'Institut Français d'Archéologie Orientale (in French). 95: 23–92. Archived from the original (PDF) on 2015-04-02.
- Baud, Michel (1999a). Famille Royale et pouvoir sous l'Ancien Empire égyptien. Tome 1 (PDF). Bibliothèque d'étude 126/1 (in French). Cairo: Institut français d'archéologie orientale. ISBN 978-2-7247-0250-7.
- Baud, Michel (1999b). Famille Royale et pouvoir sous l'Ancien Empire égyptien. Tome 2 (PDF). Bibliothèque d'étude 126/2 (in French). Cairo: Institut français d'archéologie orientale. ISBN 978-2-7247-0250-7. Archived from the original (PDF) on 2015-04-02.
- Borchardt, Ludwig (1907). Das grabdenkmal des königs Ne-user-reʻ. Ausgrabungen der Deutschen orient-gesellschaft in Abusir 1902–1904 (in German). Leipzig: J.C. Hinrichs. OCLC 6724337.
- Breasted, James Henry (1962). Ancient records of Egypt: historical documents from the earliest times to the Persian conquest (PDF). New York: Russell & Russell. OCLC 412820.
- Brovarski, Edward (2001). Der Manuelian, Peter; Simpson, William Kelly (eds.). The Senedjemib Complex, Part 1. The Mastabas of Senedjemib Inti (G 2370), Khnumenti (G 2374), and Senedjemib Mehi (G 2378). Giza Mastabas. Vol. 7. Boston: Art of the Ancient World, Museum of Fine Arts. ISBN 978-0-87846-479-1.
- Clayton, Peter (1994). Chronicle of the Pharaohs. Thames & Hudson. ISBN 978-0-500-05074-3.
- "Collection Online. Papyrus Abu Sir". British Museum.
- "Djedkare Isesi". Digital Egypt for Universities.
- "Djedkare on the BMFA online collection". Boston Museum of Fine Arts.
- "Djedkare on the MMA online catalog". Metropolitan Museum of Art.
- Dodson, Aidan; Hilton, Dyan (2004). The Complete Royal Families of Ancient Egypt. London: Thames & Hudson Ltd. ISBN 978-0-500-05128-3.
- Dorman, Peter (2015). "The 5th dynasty (c. 2465–c. 2325 bc)". Encyclopædia Britannica Online.
- Eichler, Eckhard (1991). "Untersuchungen zu den Königsbriefen des Alten Reiches". Studien zur altägyptischen Kultur (SAK) (in German). 18: 141–171. ISSN 0340-2215.
- Gardiner, Alan; Peet, Eric; Černý, Jaroslav (1955). The inscriptions of Sinai. London: Egypt Exploration Society. OCLC 699651.
- Gardiner, Alan (1959). The Royal Canon of Turin. Griffith Institute, Ashmolean Museum. OCLC 21484338.
- Goedicke, Hans (2000). "Abusir–Saqqara–Giza". In Bárta, Miroslav; Krejčí, Jaromír (eds.). Abusir and Saqqara in the year 2000. Archiv Orientální, Supplementa. Vol. 9. Prague: Academy of Sciences of the Czech Republic, Oriental Institute. pp. 397–412. ISBN 978-8-08-542539-0.
- Goelet, Ogden (1999). "Abu Gurab". In Bard, Kathryn; Shubert, Stephen Blake (eds.). Encyclopedia of the archaeology of ancient Egypt. London; New York: Routledge. pp. 85–87. ISBN 978-0-203-98283-9.
- Griffiths, John Gwyn (1966). The origins of Osiris. Münchner ägyptologische Studien. Vol. 9. Berlin: Bruno Hessling. OCLC 470565768.
- Grimal, Nicolas (1992). A History of Ancient Egypt. Translated by Ian Shaw. Oxford: Blackwell publishing. ISBN 978-0-631-19396-8.
- Harrell, James (2001). "Diorite and related rocks". In Redford, Donald B. (ed.). The Oxford Encyclopedia of Ancient Egypt, Volume 1. Oxford University Press. pp. 395–396. ISBN 978-0-19-510234-5.
- Hawass, Zahi; Senussi, Ashraf (2008). Old Kingdom Pottery from Giza. American University in Cairo Press. ISBN 978-977-305-986-6.
- Hayes, William (1978). The Scepter of Egypt: A Background for the Study of the Egyptian Antiquities in The Metropolitan Museum of Art. Vol. 1, From the Earliest Times to the End of the Middle Kingdom. New York: Metropolitan Museum of Art. OCLC 7427345.
- Horne, Charles Francis (1917). The Sacred Books and Early Literature of the East: with historical surveys of the chief writings of each nation. Vol. II: Egypt. New York: Parke, Austin, & Lipscomb. OCLC 557745.
- Hornung, Erik; Krauss, Rolf; Warburton, David, eds. (2012). Ancient Egyptian Chronology. Handbook of Oriental Studies. Section One, Near and Middle East. Leiden and Boston: Brill. ISBN 978-90-04-11385-5. ISSN 0169-9423.
- Jánosi, Peter (1989). "Die Pyramidenanlage der "anonymen Königin" des Djedkare-Isesi". Mitteilungen des Deutschen Archäologischen Instituts, Abteilung Kairo (in German). 45. Zabern Verlag. ISBN 978-3-8053-1106-9.
- Jánosi, Peter (2016). The Pyramid Complex of Amenemhat I at Lisht, The Reliefs. New Haven, London: The Metropolitan Museum of Art, Yale University Press. ISBN 978-1-58839-605-1.
- Kanawati, Naguib (1980). Governmental reforms in Old Kingdom Egypt. Modern Egyptology series. Warminster, England: Aris & Phillips. ISBN 978-0-85668-168-4.
- Kanawati, Naguib; McFarlane, Ann S. (1993). Deshasha: the tombs of Inti, Shedu and others. Reports (Australian Centre for Egyptology). Vol. 5. Sydney: The Australian Centre for Egyptology. ISBN 978-0-85668-617-7.
- Kanawati, Naguib (2003). Conspiracies in the Egyptian Palace: Unis to Pepy I. London; New York: Routledge. ISBN 978-0-203-16673-4.
- Klemm, Rosemarie; Klemm, Dietrich (2013). Gold and gold mining in ancient Egypt and Nubia : geoarchaeology of the ancient gold mining sites in the Egyptian and Sudanese eastern deserts. Natural science in archaeology. Berlin; New-York: Springer. ISBN 978-1-283-93479-4.
- Labrousse, Audran; Lauer, Jean-Philippe; Leclant, Jean (1977). Le temple haut du complexe funéraire du roi Ounas. Bibliothèque d'étude, tome 73. Cairo: Institut français d'archéologie orientale du Caire. OCLC 5065554.
- Leclant, Jean (1999). "Saqqara, pyramids of the 5th and 6th Dynasties". In Bard, Kathryn; Shubert, Stephen Blake (eds.). Encyclopedia of the archaeology of ancient Egypt. London; New York: Routledge. pp. 865–868. ISBN 978-0-203-98283-9.
- Lehner, Mark (2008). The Complete Pyramids. New York: Thames & Hudson. ISBN 978-0-500-28547-3.
- Leprohon, Ronald J. (2013). The great name: ancient Egyptian royal titulary. Writings from the ancient world, no. 33. Atlanta: Society of Biblical Literature. ISBN 978-1-58983-736-2.
- Lepsius, Karl Richard (1846–1856). Denkmäler aus Ägypten und Äthiopien, Abteilung II Band III: Altes Reich (in German). Berlin. OCLC 60700892.
- Lloyd, Alan (2010). Lloyd, Alan (ed.). A Companion to Ancient Egypt. Volume I. Wiley-Blackwell. ISBN 978-1-4051-5598-4.
- "Louvre, online collection". Site Officiel du Musée du Louvre.
- Malek, Jaromir (2000). "The Old Kingdom (c.2160–2055 BC)". In Shaw, Ian (ed.). The Oxford History of Ancient Egypt. Oxford University Press. ISBN 978-0-19-815034-3.
- Maragioglio, Vito; Rinaldi, Celeste (1963–1977). L'architettura delle piramidi Menfite II-VIII (in Italian). Torino: Rapallo. OCLC 891321950.
- Marcolin, Michele (2006). "Iny, a much-traveled official of the Sixth Dynasty: unpublished reliefs in Japan". In Bárta, Miroslav; Coppens, Filip; Krejčí, Jaromír (eds.). Abusir and Saqqara in the Year 2005, Proceedings of the Conference held in Prague (June 27 – July 5, 2005). Prague: Academy of Sciences of the Czech Republic, Oriental Institute. pp. 282–310. ISBN 978-80-7308-116-4.
- Mariette, Auguste (1864). "La table de Saqqarah". Revue Archéologique (in French). 10. Paris: 168–186 & Pl. 17.
- Mariette, Auguste (1885). Maspero, Gaston (ed.). Les mastabas de l'ancien empire : fragment du dernier ouvrage de Auguste Édouard Mariette (PDF). Paris: F. Vieweg. pp. 189–191. OCLC 722498663.
- Morales, Antonio J. (2006). "Traces of official and popular veneration to Nyuserra Iny at Abusir. Late Fifth Dynasty to the Middle Kingdom". In Bárta, Miroslav; Coppens, Filip; Krejčí, Jaromír (eds.). Abusir and Saqqara in the Year 2005, Proceedings of the Conference held in Prague (June 27 – July 5, 2005). Prague: Academy of Sciences of the Czech Republic, Oriental Institute. pp. 311–341. ISBN 978-80-7308-116-4.
- Moursi, Mohamed (1987). "Die Ausgrabungen in der Gegend um die Pyramide des Dd-KA-Ra "Issj" bei Saqqara". Annales du service des antiquités de l'Égypte (in German). Institut français d'archéologie orientale du Caire: 185–198.
- Mumford, G. D. (1999). "Wadi Maghara". In Bard, Kathryn; Shubert, Stephen Blake (eds.). Encyclopedia of the archaeology of ancient Egypt. London; New York: Routledge. pp. 1071–1075. ISBN 978-0-203-98283-9.
- Munro, Peter (1993). Das Unas-Friedhof Nord-West I: topographisch-historische Einleitung (in German). Mainz am Rhein: Philipp von Zabern. ISBN 978-3-8053-1353-7.
- Murray, Margaret Alice (1905). Saqqara Mastabas. Part I (PDF). Egyptian research account, 10th year. London: Bernard Quaritch. OCLC 458801811.
- Nelson, Harold Hayden (1934). Fragments of Egyptian Old Kingdom stone vases from Byblos. Berytus. Beirut: American Press. OCLC 43136638.
- "Nubia". Catholic Encyclopedia.
- Petrie, Flinders (1898). Deshasheh, 1897. London, Boston: Sold at the offices of the Egypt Exploration Fund 1898. OCLC 499980.
- Petrie, Flinders; Weigall, Arthur; Saba, Mahmoud (1902). Abydos: part I. London: Egypt Exploration Fund. doi:10.11588/DIGLIT.4102. OCLC 66463090.
- "Petrie museum, online collection". Petrie Museum.
- Pierret, Paul (1873). Catalogue de la Salle historique de la Galerie égyptienne suivi d'un glossaire (in French). Paris: C. de Mourgues frères. OCLC 681506729.
- Posener-Kriéger, Paule; de Cenival, Jean Louis (1968). The Abu Sir Papyri. Hieratic papyri in the British Museum. Vol. 5. London: Trustees of the British Museum. OCLC 5035958.
- Porter, Bertha; Moss, Rosalind L. B.; Burney, Ethel W.; Malek, Jaromír (1981). Topographical bibliography of ancient Egyptian hieroglyphic texts, reliefs, and paintings. III Memphis; Pt. 2. Ṣaqqâra to Dahshûr (PDF). Oxford: Griffith Institute. ISBN 978-0-900416-24-8.
- Porter, Bertha; Moss, Rosalind L. B.; Burney, Ethel W. (1951). Topographical bibliography of ancient Egyptian hieroglyphic texts, reliefs, and paintings. VII Nubia, the deserts, and outside Egypt (PDF). Oxford: Griffith Institute, Clarendon Press. OCLC 312542797.
- Redford, Donald (1992). Egypt, Canaan, and Israel in Ancient Times. Princeton: Princeton University Press. ISBN 978-0-691-03606-9.
- Rice, Michael (1999). Who is who in Ancient Egypt. Routledge London & New York. ISBN 978-0-203-44328-6.
- Roccati, Alessandro (1982). La Littérature historique sous l'ancien empire égyptien. Littératures anciennes du Proche-Orient (in French). Vol. 11. Paris: Editions du Cerf. ISBN 978-2-204-01895-1.
- Roth, Ann Macy (1995). A cemetery of palace attendants: including G 2084–2099, G 2230+2231, and G 2240. Giza Mastabas. Vol. 6. Boston: Dept. of Ancient Egyptian, Nubian, and Near Eastern Art, Museum of Fine Arts, Boston. ISBN 978-0-87846-385-5.
- Schmitz, Bettina (1976). Untersuchungen zum Titel s3-njśwt "Königssohn". Habelts Dissertationsdrucke: Reihe Ägyptologie (in German). Vol. 2. Bonn: Habelt. ISBN 978-3-7749-1370-7.
- Schott, E. (1977). "Die Biographie des Ka-em-tenenet". In Otto, Eberhard; Assmann, Jan; Feucht, Erika; Grieshammer, Reinhard (eds.). Fragen an die altägyptische Literatur : Studien zum Gedenken an Eberhard Otto (in German). Wiesbaden: Reichert. pp. 443–461. ISBN 978-3-88226-002-1.
- Schulman, Alan (1979). "Beyond the fringe. Sources for Old Kingdom foreign affairs". Journal of the Society for the Study of Egyptian Antiquities. 9: 79–104. ISSN 0383-9753.
- "Seal of office". Collections: The Ancient World. Boston Museum of Fine Arts.
- Seipel, Wilfried (1980). Untersuchungen zu den ägyptischen Königinnen der Frühzeit und des Alten Reiches : Quellen und historische Einordnung (Thesis) (in German). Universität Hamburg. OCLC 256076594.
- Sethe, Kurt Heinrich (1903). Urkunden des Alten Reichs (in German). wikipedia entry: Urkunden des Alten Reichs. Leipzig: J.C. Hinrichs. OCLC 846318602.
- Sicker, Martin (2000). The pre-Islamic Middle East. Westport, Connecticut: Praeger. ISBN 978-0-313-00083-6.
- Sowada, Karin N.; Grave, Peter (2009). Egypt in the Eastern Mediterranean during the Old Kingdom: an archaeological perspective. Orbis biblicus et orientalis, 237. Fribourg: Academic Press; Göttingen: Vandenhoeck & Ruprecht. ISBN 9783525534557.
- Stadelman, Rainer (1987). "Königinnengrab und Pyramidenbezirk im Alten Reich". Annales du service des antiquités de l'Égypte. 71: 251–260.
- Stevenson Smith, William (1971). "The Old Kingdom in Egypt". In Edwards, I. E. S.; Gadd, C. J.; Hammond, N. G. L. (eds.). The Cambridge Ancient History, Vol. 2, Part 2: Early History of the Middle East. Cambridge: Cambridge University Press. pp. 145–207. ISBN 978-0-521-07791-0.
- Strouhal, Eugen; Vyhnánek, Luboš; Gaballah, M. F.; Saunders, S. R.; Woelfli, W.; Bonani, G.; Němečková, Alena (2001). "Identification of royal skeletal remains from Egyptian pyramids" (PDF). Anthropologie. 39 (1): 15–23.
- Strudwick, Nigel (1985). The Administration of Egypt in the Old Kingdom: The Highest Titles and Their Holders (PDF). Studies in Egyptology. London; Boston: Kegan Paul International. ISBN 978-0-7103-0107-9.
- Strudwick, Nigel C. (2005). Texts from the Pyramid Age. Writings from the Ancient World (book 16). Atlanta: Society of Biblical Literature. ISBN 978-1-58983-680-8.
- Tallet, Pierre (2010). "Prendre la mer à Ayn Soukhna au temps du roi Isesi" (PDF). Bulletin de la Société Française d'Égyptologie (in French). 177–178: 18–22.
- Tallet, Pierre (2012). "Ayn Sukhna and Wadi el-Jarf: Two newly discovered pharaonic harbours on the Suez Gulf" (PDF). British Museum Studies in Ancient Egypt and Sudan. 18: 147–168.
- "Tell Edfu project". University of Chicago Oriental Institute. 2018. Archived from the original on 2018-01-12.
- Thompson, Stephen (1999). "Textual sources, Old Kingdom". In Bard, Kathryn; Shubert, Stephen Blake (eds.). Encyclopedia of the archaeology of ancient Egypt. London; New York: Routledge. pp. 976–978. ISBN 978-0-203-98283-9.
- "Tomb chapel of Raemkai, MMA online catalog". Metropolitan Museum of Art.
- Trigger, Bruce (2003). Understanding early civilizations: a comparative study. Cambridge; New York: Cambridge University Press. p. 134. ISBN 978-0-521-82245-9.
- Tyldesley, Joyce (2005). À la découverte des pyramides d'Égypte. Champollion (in French). Translated by Nathalie Baum. Monaco: Éditions du Rocher. ISBN 978-2-268-05326-4.
- Valbelle, Dominique; Bonnet, Charles (1996). Le sanctuaire d'Hathor, maîtresse de la turquoise: Sérabit el-Khadim au Moyen Empire (in French). Paris: Picard. ISBN 978-2-7084-0514-1.
- Vermeule, Emily; Stone, Zemurray; Vermeule, Cornelius (1970). "Aegean Gold Hoard and the Court of Egypt". Curator: The Museum Journal. 13 (1): 32–42. doi:10.1111/j.2151-6952.1970.tb00392.x.
- Verner, Miroslav (1985). "Les sculptures de Rêneferef découvertes à Abousir [avec 16 planches]" (PDF). Bulletin de l'Institut Français d'Archéologie Orientale (in French). 85: 267–280. Archived from the original (PDF) on 2016-04-11.
- Verner, Miroslav; Zemina, Milan (1994). Forgotten pharaohs, lost pyramids: Abusir (PDF). Praha: Academia Škodaexport. ISBN 978-80-200-0022-4. Archived from the original (PDF) on 2011-02-01.
- Verner, Miroslav (2001a). "Archaeological Remarks on the 4th and 5th Dynasty Chronology" (PDF). Archiv Orientální. 69 (3): 363–418.
- Verner, Miroslav (2001b). "Old Kingdom: An Overview". In Redford, Donald B. (ed.). The Oxford Encyclopedia of Ancient Egypt, Volume 2. Oxford University Press. pp. 585–591. ISBN 978-0-19-510234-5.
- Verner, Miroslav (2002). The Pyramids: their Archaeology and History. London: Atlantic Books. ISBN 978-1-903809-45-7.
- Verner, Miroslav; Callender, Vivienne; Strouhal, Evžen (2002). Abusir VI: Djedkare's family cemetery (PDF). Excavations of the Czech Institute of Egyptology. Prague: Czech Institute of Egyptology, Faculty of Arts, Charles University. ISBN 978-80-86277-22-6. Archived (PDF) from the original on 2013-04-07.
- von Beckerath, Jürgen (1999). Handbuch der ägyptischen Königsnamen (in German). Münchner ägyptologische Studien, Heft 49, Mainz : Philip von Zabern. ISBN 978-3-8053-2591-2.
- Waddell, William Gillan (1971). Manetho. Loeb classical library, 350. Cambridge, Massachusetts; London: Harvard University Press; W. Heinemann. OCLC 6246102.
- Weigall, Arthur (1907). A report on the antiquities of Lower Nubia (the first Cataract to the Sudan frontier) and their condition in 1906–7. Oxford: Oxford University Press. ISBN 9781108083027. OCLC 6444528.
- Wente, Edward Frank (1990). Meltzer, Edmund S (ed.). Letters from Ancient Egypt. Writings from the ancient world. Vol. 1. Atlanta, Georgia: Scholars Press. ISBN 978-1-55540-473-4.
- Wildung, Dietrich (1969). Die Rolle ägyptischer Könige im Bewußtsein ihrer Nachwelt. Teil I. Posthume Quellen über die Könige der ersten vier Dynastien. Münchner Ägyptologische Studien (in German). Vol. 17. Berlin: Verlag Bruno Hessling. OCLC 635608696.
- Young, William J. (1972). "The Fabulous Gold of the Pactolus Valley" (PDF). Boston Museum Bulletin. LXX.

Preceded by Menkauhor Kaiu	Pharaoh of Egypt; Fifth Dynasty	Succeeded by Unas
