= Kaemtjenent =

Ancient Egyptian official

D28 m V13 n M22 M22 t
- Burial place: Badrashin, Giza, Egypt
- Years active: c. 2400 BC
- Spouse: Khenut

Kaemtjenent (Egyptian K3(j)-m-ṯnnt; fl. c. 2400 BC) was an ancient Egyptian official under king Djedkare Isesi in the late Fifth Dynasty, during the Old Kingdom period.

== Career ==
He is mainly known from his mastaba (G 7411), that is located north of the step pyramid of king Djoser at Saqqara; Kaemtjenent himself is depicted on a wall of the mastaba's portico, along with his wife. The decoration of his mastaba records a letter in which a vizier with the name of Rashepses is mentioned. This vizier is known from other sources and lived during the reign of Djedkare Isesi. On this basis, Kaemtjenent is believed to have lived under this king as well. The tombs of both officials are not far apart.

The mastaba of Kaemtjenent gives several important titles that he held, including overseer of all royal works of the king and king's son. The former title indicates that he was most likely involved in important royal building works, possibly the royal pyramid complex itself. Further titles provide evidence that he was involved in nautical expeditions. These include ḫtmw nṯr m wi3y ˁ3wy dd nrw ḥrw m ḫ3swt -god's sealer in the two great barks, who places the dread of Horus in foreign lands and imi-r3 mš3 - expedition leader.

== Filiation ==
Kaemtjenent's title King's son is somewhat more problematic. It could indicate that he was a son of a king, which is the view held by Egyptologists such as William Stevenson Smith and Edward Brovarski, who argue that he may have been a son of Djedkare Isesi with queen Meresankh IV. This is suggested by the presence of her tomb is in the vicinity of that of Kaemtjenent. Others, such as Alessandro Roccati, simply state that he had a royal father.

This filiation has been assessed differently by other Egyptologists however, as it is now known that the title of King's son was, in some instances, purely honorific. Nigel Strudwick has proposed that this is the case for Kaemtjenent. In particular, the damaged biographical inscriptions of his tomb still record some of his marine expeditions to foreign lands and his participation in great building projects. It seems from there that he received the title king's son as a promotion. This conclusion is shared by other Egyptologists, including Michel Baud.

Kaemtjenent may have been the father of Isesi-ankh, another high official serving Djedkare Isesi and his successor, Unas. His wife was a woman called Khenut.

== Bibliography ==
- Baud, Michel (1999). Famille Royale et pouvoir sous l'Ancien Empire égyptien. Tome 2 (PDF). Bibliothèque d'étude 126/2 (in French). Cairo: Institut français d'archéologie orientale. ISBN 978-2-7247-0250-7. Archived from the original (PDF) on 2015-04-02.
- Brovarski, Edward (2001). Der Manuelian, Peter; Simpson, William Kelly (eds.). The Senedjemib Complex, Part 1. The Mastabas of Senedjemib Inti (G 2370), Khnumenti (G 2374), and Senedjemib Mehi (G 2378). Giza Mastabas. Vol. 7. Boston: Art of the Ancient World, Museum of Fine Arts. ISBN 978-0-87846-479-1. Archived from the original on 2016-03-17.
- Chauvet, Violaine (2011). "Entrance-porticoes and Portico-chapels: The Creation of an Outside Ritual Stage in Private Tombs of the Old Kingdom". In Bárta, Miroslav; Coppens, Filip; Krejčí, Jaromír (eds.). Abusir and Saqqara in the Year 2010 /1. Prague: Charles University. pp. 261–311. ISBN 978-80-7308-384-7.
- Jones, Dilwyn (2000). An Index of Ancient Egyptian Titles, Epithets and Phrases of the Old Kingdom. Oxford: Archaeopress. OCLC 46226552.
- Mariette, Auguste; Maspero, Gaston (1889). Les mastabas de l'Ancien Empire: Fragment du dernier ouvrage de A. Mariette, publié d'après le manuscrit de l'auteur. Paris. ISBN 1841710695.
- Roccati, Alessandro (1982). La Littérature historique sous l'ancien empire égyptien. Littératures anciennes du Proche-Orient (in French). Vol. 11. Paris: Editions du Cerf. ISBN 978-2-20-401895-1.
- Strudwick, Nigel (1985). The administration of Egypt in the Old Kingdom: the highest titles and their holders (PDF). Studies in Egyptology. London, Boston: KPI. ISBN 978-0-71-030107-9. Archived from the original (PDF) on 2014-04-03.
- Stevenson Smith, William (1971). "The Old Kingdom in Egypt". In Edwards, I. E. S.; Gadd, C. J.; Hammond, N. G. L. (eds.). The Cambridge Ancient History, Vol. 2, Part 2: Early History of the Middle East. Cambridge: Cambridge University Press. pp. 145–207. ISBN 978-0-521-07791-0.
