= Meret-Isesi =

Princess of Egypt

- Occupation: Princess of Egypt
- Years active: c. 2400 BC
- Parent: Djedkare Isesi
- Relatives: Several siblings

Meret-Isesi (also Mereret-Isesi; "Beloved by Isesi"; fl. c. 2400 BC) was a Princess of Egypt during the 5th Dynasty. Her father was King Djedkare. Meret-Isesi appears as a King's daughter of his body in a relief which likely comes from Abusir.

The relief can be found on the Brooklyn Museum page for Mereret-Isesi. The caption identifies this princess as Kekheretnebti (she was a sister of Mereret-Isesi), but the text clearly identifies her as Mereret-Isesi.
