= Neserkauhor =

Ancient Egyptian prince

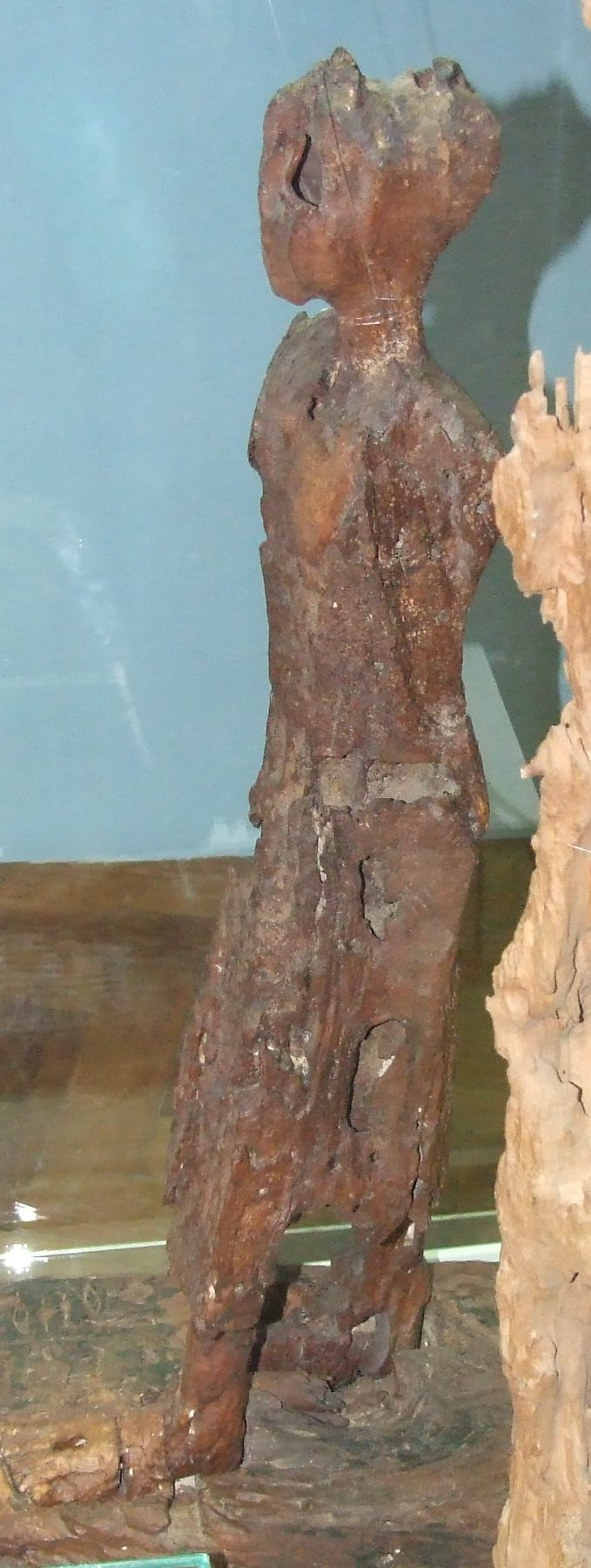
- Statue of Neserkauhor from his tomb in Abusir
- Burial place: Giza, Egypt
- Parent: Isesi

Neserkauhor was an Ancient Egyptian prince, son of king Djedkare Isesi, during the second half of Fifth Dynasty. Neserkauhor was buried in Abusir, in an area known today as "Djedkare's family cemetery".

== Career ==
Neserkauhor was a son of Djedkare Isesi, who held a number of honorary titles: "revered with the Great God", "hereditary prince", "greatest of five in the temple of Thoth", "one who is privy to the secrets of the god's word", "chief lector priest", "king's son", "eldest beloved king's son of his body", "sole companion", and "scribe of the good book".

It is debated whether Neserkauhor had any real profession or if his titles were purely honorary and he simply spent his life at the royal court. Indeed, princes of royal blood did not hold public offices in the early Fifth Dynasty, however they are known to have acted as overseers of the construction of the king's pyramid during the subsequent Sixth Dynasty. It is thus possible that Neserkauhor, who lived between these two periods, acted as overseer on some of his father's projects.

We do not know who his mother was. Neserkauhor was buried in Abusir, in a cemetery built in the second half of Djedkare's reign. His tomb seems to date to a slightly later date than that of his sister Kekheretnebti and the nobleman Idu. When Neserkauhor's mastaba was excavated in the 1980s, a large number of wooden statues were found.

== Bibliography ==
- Verner, Miroslav; Callender, Vivienne; Strouhal, Evžen (2002). Abusir VI: Djedkare's family cemetery (PDF). Excavations of the Czech Institute of Egyptology. Prague: Czech Institute of Egyptology, Faculty of Arts, Charles University. ISBN 978-8-08-627722-6. Archived from the original (PDF) on 2013-04-07.
