= Meresankh IV =

Queen consort of Egypt

U6 S29 S34
mr.s 'nḥ
- Burial place: Badrashin, Giza, Egypt
- Years active: c. 2420 BC
- Title: Royal Wife

Meresankh IV (also Mersyankh IV; fl. c. 2420 BC) was an ancient Egyptian queen believed to have lived during the Fifth Dynasty of the Old Kingdom. Her familial ties are the subject of ongoing speculation.

== Life ==
There are few surviving attestations that can offer insight into Meresankh IV's life. However, it is very probable that she reigned sometime during the Fifth Dynasty, owing to the satisfactorily dated monuments that surround her burial.

In her treatise, Decoration in Egyptian Tombs of the Old Kingdom: Studies in Orientation and Scene Content, historian Yvonne Harpur offers a more precise range, linking Meresankh IV to either of the last two kings of the Fifth Dynasty, Djedkare, or less likely, Unas.

More recent attempts to date Meresankh IV's life have coalesced around other kings such as Nyuserre and Menkauhor. British Egyptologist and historian Aidan Dodson suggests she lived during the reign of Menkauhor, whereas French Egyptologist Michel Baud, while preferring Nyuserre or Menkauhor, finds no reason to exclude any of the last four kings of the Fifth Dynasty.

Meresankh IV held the title King's Wife to an unnamed king. Accordingly, she was a figure of royal stature and would have been present at court in the course of her life.

It has been speculated that Meresankh IV fell into disgrace at some point during her life. Wilfried Seipel believes that she can be linked with a grave adjacent to the funerary complex of the king Djedkare, from which she would have later been ostracised. Baud acknowledges the possibility, but he notes that such a conclusion is conjectural, given the lack of any positive evidence to support this.

== Titulary ==
Meresankh IV was accorded the following titles:

- King's Wife
- Great of Praises
- Priestess of Thoth
- Priestess of Tjazepef
- Directress of the Butchers in the Acacia House

Other epithets ascribed to her are known from her burial, which include: great one of the Hetes-Sceptre, she who sees Horus and Set, attendant of Horus, companion of Horus, and consort of the beloved of the Two Ladies.

== Family ==
Meresankh IV's genealogy remains a topic of speculation. Historian Peter Jánosi characterises her relationships as unknown. Though Meresankh IV held the title King's Wife, there exists no record of other titles that would otherwise indicate that she was of royal heritage.

Field Egyptologist George Reisner proposed that Meresankh IV was a wife of Djedkare, and that with him she bore prince Raemka, and possibly the officials Isesi-ankh and Kaemtjenent, a proposition later largely supported by The Cambridge Ancient History, where it is observed that a number of apparently Fifth Dynasty figures were interred alongside the enclosure wall north of the Step Pyramid belonging to Third Dynasty king Djoser. Reisner cites the proximal association of these Fifth Dynasty tombs in his reasoning.

However, the theory that either Isesi-ankh or Kaemtjenent were sons of Djedkare, or any king at all, has been called into question. Baud dismisses the idea that either of these two figures were possible sons of Djedkare on account of their titulary. He asserts that the title King's Son, for which both figures are attested, can be shown to have been purely honorific in nature. Though this casts doubt on the family ties of these two figures, it does not preclude the possibility that Meresankh IV was the wife of Djedkare, a position favoured by Seipel and historian Lana Troy.

Porter and Moss also support Meresankh IV to have been a wife of Djedkare, regarding prince Raemka to have been his son. Though they stop short of outwardly proposing Meresankh IV to have been Raemka's mother, Harpur later makes this attribution. German Egytpologist Peter Munro separately speculated that Meresankh IV was the mother of the king Unas, the last ruler of the Fifth Dynasty.

Baud prefers to date Meresankh IV to the reigns of either Nyuserre or Menkauhor, though he acknowledges the possibility she might have lived later in the dynasty. More specifically, Dodson and later Tyldesley partner her with Menkauhor, with Dodson and Hilton further proposing Meresankh IV to be the mother of Raemka and Kaemtjenent in reconstructing the family tree of the Fifth Dynasty royals. Dodson and Hilton cite the nearby associated burials in their reasoning. However, in a 2016 journal article, in an apparent contradiction, Dodson later simply elevates Troy's earlier position that Meresankh IV was a wife of Djedkare.

== Burial ==
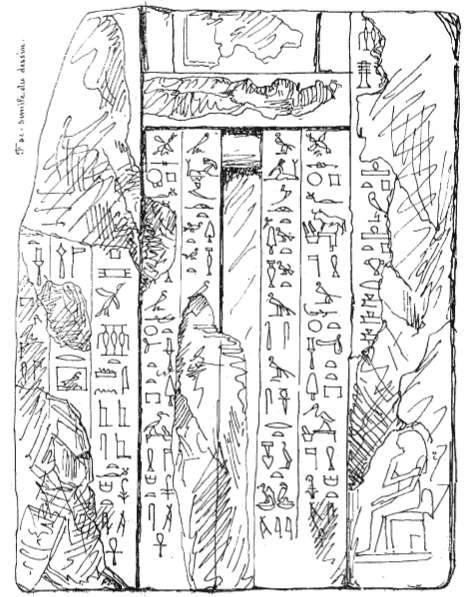
Sketch of the stele found in mastaba D 5, recorded by Mariette

Meresankh IV was buried in mastaba D 15 (No. 82) in Saqqara in the northern sector of the Step Pyramid complex, alongside several other Fifth Dynasty figures.

The mastaba was discovered by Austrian archaeologist and Egyptologist Auguste Mariette in the late 19th century, whose excavations in Saqqara were posthumously published in Les Mastabas de l'Ancien Empire.

The mastaba is only briefly described by Maritette. He assessed the mastaba to have consisted of but one interior chamber and noted that it had been constructed with limestone of a poor choice. He recorded no yield other than a severely weathered stele. In order to record its inscription, Mariette and his team resorted to plastering the stele with stucco.

The mastaba was re-explored by British Egyptologist James Quibell at some time between 1907 and 1908 while surveying tombs in the Saqqara necropolis that might potentially be dismantled and sold to Western museums. Quibell noted that in the intervening time between his excavation and Mariette's, the stele had deteriorated to the point of illegibility. However, Quibell identified a fresco-secco scene on the south wall not recorded by Mariette. He describes a scene of two registers of various figures singing, dancing, clapping and playing the harp. He notes that the red guidelines used by the artists had been left, which implies that the paintwork was never finished.

Jánosi observes that the burial of Meresankh IV is one of only a few peculiar cases in Saqqara of queens seemingly buried out of context, away from whomever their husband might have been. In an attempt to link the two figures, Seipel has speculated that Meresankh IV's intended burial was a grave adjacent to the Pyramid of Djedkare, but that she fell out of favour, however this theory has been questioned on the grounds that it lacks supportive evidence.

== Attestations ==
Meresankh IV is scarcely attested, and there survives no known record of her life other than that which Mariette was able to recover from the stele in her mastaba.

== Bibliography ==
- Grajetzki, Wolfram (2005). Ancient Egyptian Queens: A Hieroglyphic Dictionary. London: Golden House Publications.
- Hany, Noha (2019). "A Study of the King Menkauhor / The 5th Dynasty". Studies on the Arab World Monuments (in Arabic). Vol. 22. pp. 41–63.
