= Hedjetnebu =

- Burial place: Giza, Egypt
- Parent: Isesi

Hedjetnebu (Hedjetnub) was a Princess of Egypt who lived during the 5th Dynasty. Her father was King Djedkare.

== Biography ==
Hedjetnebu was buried in a tomb in Abusir, south-east of the mortuary temple of Niuserre. The skeletal remains of the princess show that she was a slender woman of 18–19 years when she died. Hedjetnebu was a full sister of princess Kekheretnebti, who was buried in a tomb nearby. The examination of the skeletal remains shows that the sisters had some similarities and were both related to Djedkare Isesi. Evidence shows that Kekheretnebti's tomb was constructed first, soon followed by the construction of the tomb of Hedjetnebu. A scribe to the royal children named Idu had a tomb constructed a short time after the tomb construction for the princesses.
