= Rashepses =

Ancient Egyptian vizier

- Vizier of Egypt
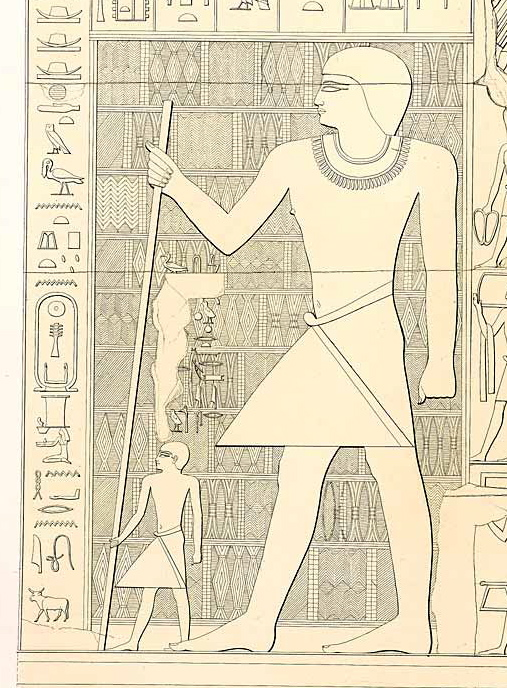
- Rashepses as depicted in his tomb in Saqqara
Egyptian name
r a A51 s sRˁ-Šp.ss
- Tenure: c. 2400 BC
- Pharaoh: Isesi
- Burial: Mastaba LG16, Saqqara, Egypt
- Children: Possibly Netjer-user

Rashepses (fl. c. 2400 BC) was a vizier from the Fifth Dynasty of Egypt. Rashepses was vizier under Djedkare Isesi. A letter directed to Rashepses has been preserved. This decree is inscribed in his tomb in Saqqara. As vizier, he was one of the most important Ancient Egyptian officials. In his tomb, many titles are recorded. It seems that he was first overseer of the scribes of the royal documents, overseer of the two granaries and overseer of all royal works. These are all very important titles, making him an influential official at the royal court. At the final stage of his career he became vizier. The vizier title is only preserved in two letters that are copied on the decoration of the tomb. It seems that most of his tomb was finished and after all that, he was promoted.

== Burial ==
Rashepses was buried in Saqqara. It received the number LG16 from the expedition under Karl Richard Lepsius, that recorded the tomb in the middle of the 19th century. His mastaba is located north of funerary complex of Djoser among a group of tombs of the Fifth Dynasty, along with his contemporaries Perneb and Raemka.

The tomb is decorated with classic images of the presentation of offerings and a set of scenes related to the funerary cult of the vizier. The underground burial chamber is decorated with paintings. Decorated burial chambers are common at the end of the Fifth Dynasty and in the Sixth Dynasty. The burial chamber of Rashepses might be the earliest decorated one.

In the serdab, a head of a wooden statue was discovered with the type of headdress which became very popular in the Sixth dynasty. This head is now in the Imhotep Museum.

== Bibliography ==
- Strudwick, Nigel (1985). The administration of Egypt in the Old Kingdom: the highest titles and their holders (PDF). Studies in Egyptology. London, Boston: KPI. ISBN 978-0-71-030107-9. Archived from the original (PDF) on 2014-04-03.
- Hany Abdallah El-Tayeb: The burial chamber of Rashepses at Saqqara, in: Egyptian Archaeology 44 (Spring 2014), 8-9
