= Raemka =

r a m kA
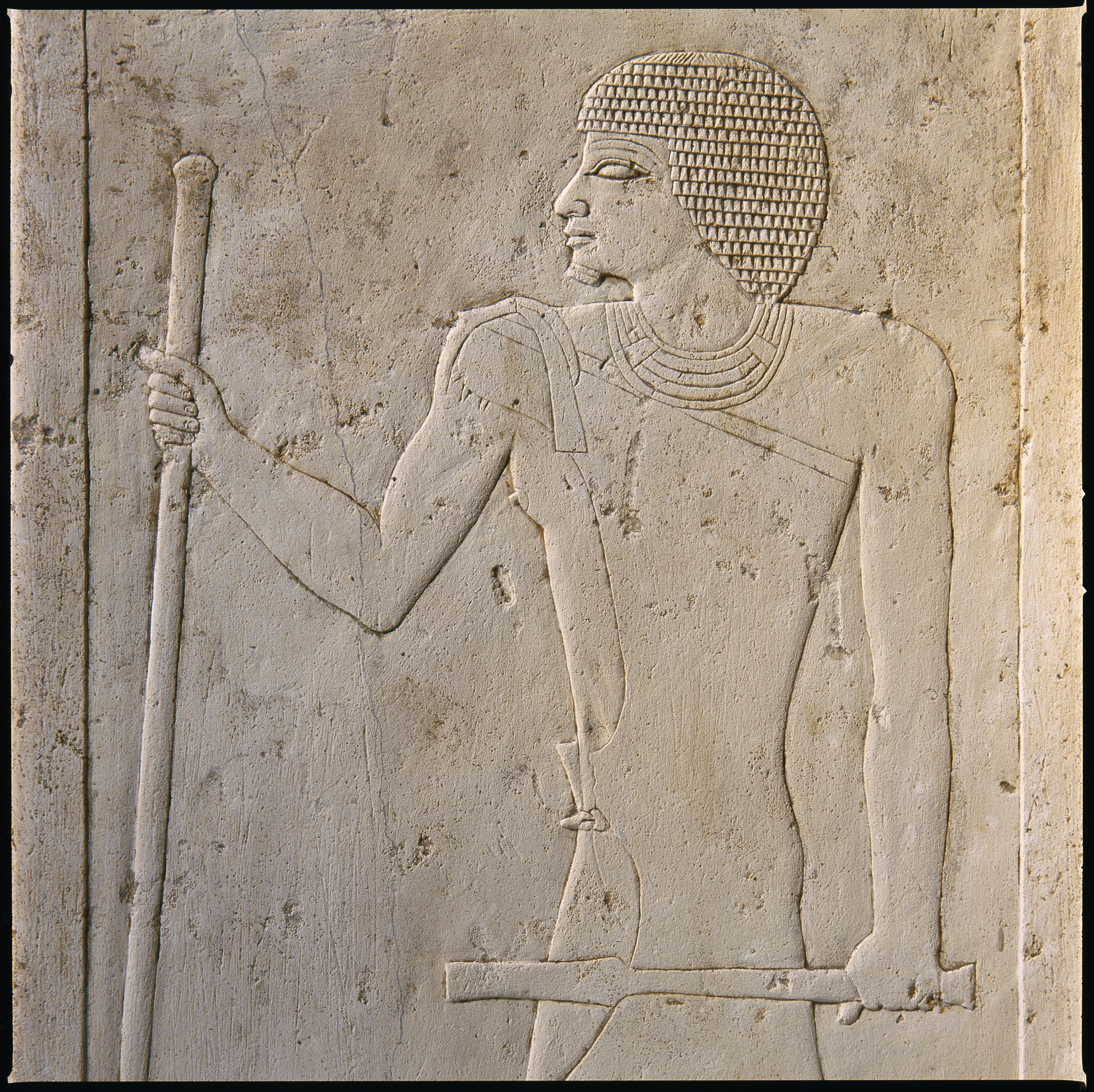
- Burial place: Badrashin, Giza, Egypt
- Years active: c. 2420 BC

Raemka (Raemkai, Remkuy) (fl. c. 2420 BC) was an ancient Egyptian prince of the Fifth Dynasty. He was buried in tomb 80 in Saqqara and was possibly a son of King Menkauhor Kaiu and Queen Meresankh IV.

Raemkaʻs tomb was originally excavated by Auguste Mariette. The tomb is listed as D3 in Mastabas.

One of the chambers from the tomb was acquired by the Metropolitan Museum of Art. The chamber is decorated with hunting scenes, agricultural scenes and depictions of a statue being transported.
