= Kekheretnebti =

- Princess of Egypt
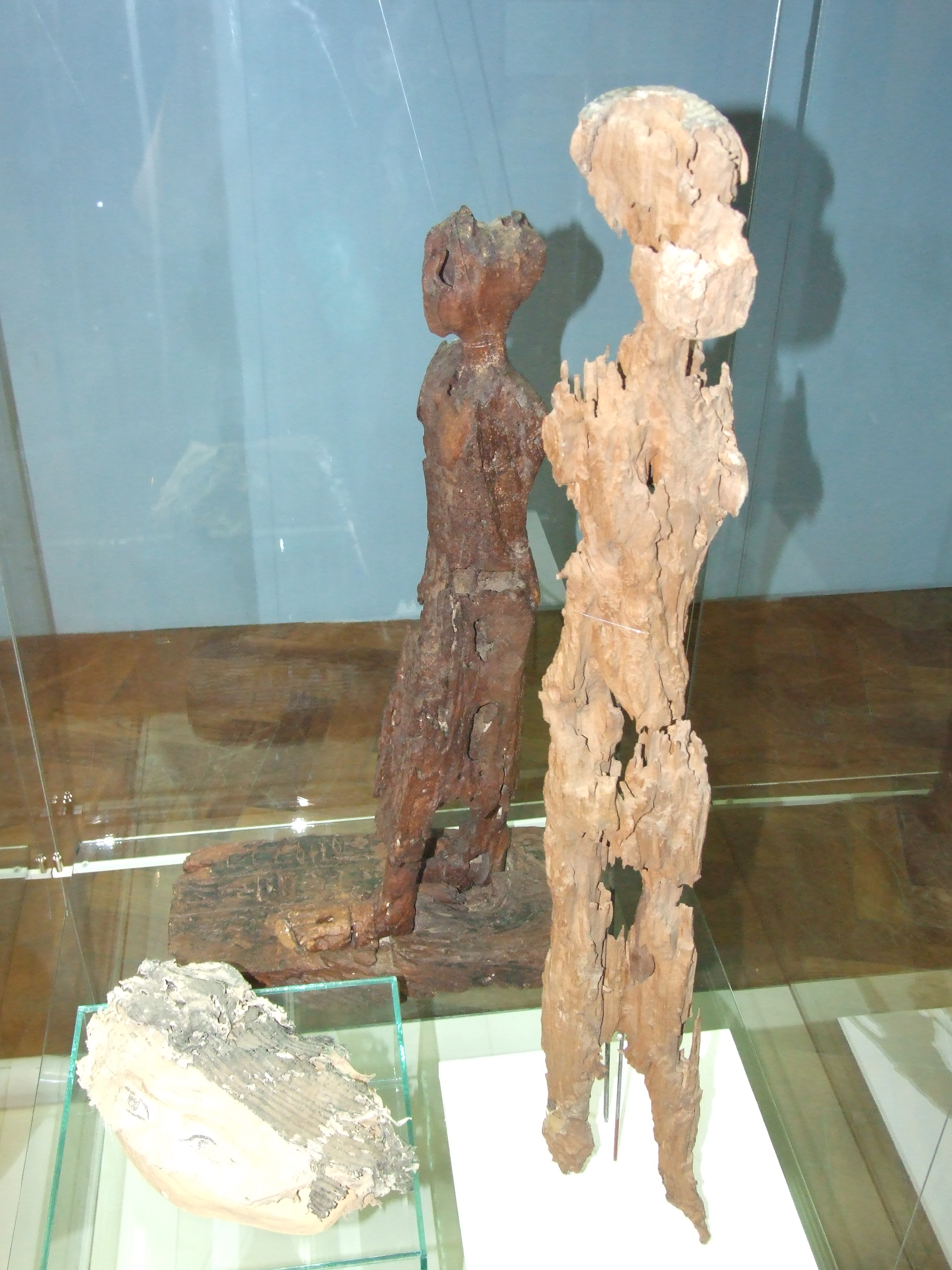
- Wooden statue of the Princess Khekeretnebti, found in the mastaba of Abousir - Náprstek Museum in Prague
- Burial: Mastaba B at Abusir
- Issue: Tisethor
- Dynasty: Fifth Dynasty of Egypt
- Father: Djedkare Isesi

Kekheretnebti or Khekeretnebty was a Princess of Egypt, who lived during the Fifth Dynasty. Her father was Pharaoh Djedkare Isesi.

Kekheretnebti was buried in a mastaba ('B') in the royal necropolis at Abusir, south-east of the mortuary temple of Niuserre. Her skeletal remains show that she was a slender woman of 30–35 years when she died. Originally the mastaba belonged only to Kekheretnebti but later on the tomb was reconstructed and enlarged on the northern side to include a second burial, that of Kekheretnebti's daughter Tisethor, who had barely reached the age of puberty.

Kekheretnebti was a full sister of princess Hedjetnebu who was buried in a tomb nearby. The examination of the skeletal remains show that the sisters showed some similarities and were both clearly related to Djedkare Isesi. Archaeological evidence shows that Kekheretnebti's tomb was constructed first, soon followed by the construction of the tomb of her sister Hedjetnebu. A scribe to the royal children named Idu had a tomb constructed a short time after the tomb construction for the princesses.

== Burial site ==
The burial mastaba of Kekheretnebti is nineteen meters long and fifteen meters wide and built of limestone and brick. It has a single entry on its eastern side which gives access to a suite of rooms arranged in a row. Despite having been looted by tomb robbers in ancient times, upon excavation the mastaba was found to be relatively well preserved and in places still had roofing blocks in position. The tomb consisted of an antechamber, two offering rooms and a serdab which contained the funerary statue of the princess. The hastily executed decoration of the offering room, roughly cut false door stelae and inferior wall paintings, including an unfinished painting of Kekheretnebti (sitting in a chair and watching wild animals), leads to the assumption that the death of Kekheretnebti was unexpected.
