= Michel Baud =

French Egyptologist

Michel Baud (11 November 1963 – 13 September 2012) was a French Egyptologist, head of the Nubian Sudan section in the Department of Egyptian Antiquities of the Louvre Museum. As such, he was the organizer of an exhibition devoted exclusively to Meroe, Sudan's ancient kingdom known for its legendary capital city and its famous royal necropolis. He was also the director of the archaeological mission on the site of the necropolis at Abu Rawash, and published papers on it such as La ceramique miniature d'Abou Rawash. He was a resident of the French Institute of Oriental Archaeology in Cairo. He was also the author of works on the late Old Kingdom South Saqqara Stone annal document with Vassil Dobrev, published between 1995 and 1997 in BIFAO.

Baud died on 13 September 2012 at the age of 48.

== Major publications ==
- Djéser et la IIIe dynastie : Imhotep, Saqqara, Memphis, les pyramides à degrés, Paris, Pygmalion, coll. « Les Grands Pharaons », 2007, 302 p. (ISBN 9782756401478)
- Famille royale et pouvoir sous l'Ancien Empire égyptien. Tome 1 & 2, Institut français d'archéologie orientale (1999), Bibliothèque d'étude 126, ISBN 978-2-72-470250-7, available online
- De nouvelles annales de l'Ancien Empire Egyptien. Une "Pierre de Palerme" pour la VIe dynastie, Bulletin de l'Institut Francais d'Archeologie Orientale 95, pp. 23–92, available online
- Méroé, un empire sur le Nil, Officina Libraria, 2010 (ISBN 9788889854501)
