= Werbauba =

Ancient Egyptian official

- Vizier of Egypt
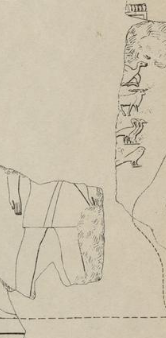
- Werbauba on Sahure's royal hunt relief
Egyptian name
E10 G30 wr
- Tenure: c. 2480 BC
- Pharaoh: Sahure

Werbauba (fl. c. 2480 BC) was an Ancient Egyptian official of the Fifth Dynasty during the reign of king Sahure. He had the titles of a vizier and was therefore the highest official at the royal court, second only to the king. Werbauba is only known from the reliefs found in the mortuary temple of king Sahure at Abusir. In a relief, he is shown behind the king, the first in a row of officials. The whole scene is a representation of a royal hunt, which is now heavily damaged. Werbauba is depicted in the lowest register as the first person. Only his name and three titles are preserved: the one of the curtain, official (z3b) and vizier. This title combination is typical for an Old Kingdom vizier. It has been argued that this part of the temple was finished at the end of the king's reign, so that Werbauba was in office at the end of Sahure's life and perhaps even beyond, into the reign of Neferirkare Kakai.

== Literature ==
- Borchardt, Ludwig (1913). Das Grabdenkmal des Königs S'aḥu-Re (Band 2): Die Wandbilder: Abbildungsblätter. Leipzig. doi:10.11588/DIGLIT.3366.
- Strudwick, Nigel (1985). The Administration of Egypt in the Old Kingdom: The Highest Titles and Their Holders (PDF). Studies in Egyptology. London; Boston: Kegan Paul International. ISBN 978-0-7103-0107-9. Archived from the original (PDF) on 2014-04-03.
