= Pyramid of Pepi II =

Collapsed pyramid in Egypt, the tomb of Pharaoh Pepi II

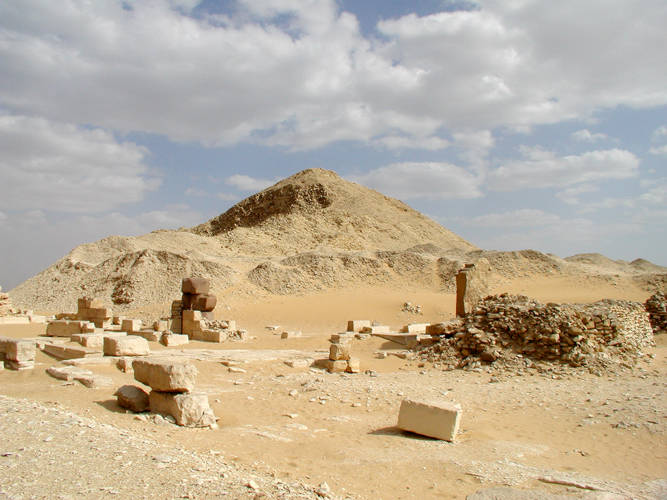
- Interactive map of Pyramid of Pepi II
- 29.8403°N 31.2133°E
- Location: Badrshein, Giza, Egypt
- Owner: Pepi II
Ancient name
< ra nfr kA > mn n anx O24 Mn-ˁnḫ Nfr-k3-Rˁ ("Long-lasting is the Life of Neferkare")
- Constructed: c. 2250 BC
- Type: True pyramid
- Height: 52.4 m (172 ft)
- Base: 78.75 m (258.4 ft)

The Pyramid of Pepi II was the tomb of King Pepi II, located in southern Saqqara, to the northwest of the Mastabat al-Fir'aun. It was the final full pyramid complex to be built in Ancient Egypt. Long used as a quarry, the pyramid was excavated for the first time by Gaston Maspero in 1881. Its ruins were studied in exhaustive detail by Gustave Jéquier, who was able to reconstruct the funerary complex and the texts on the walls of the funerary chamber in the course of his excavation campaigns from 1932–1935. Since 1996, thorough investigations of the pyramid and its surroundings have been carried out by the Mission a.

== The pyramid complex ==
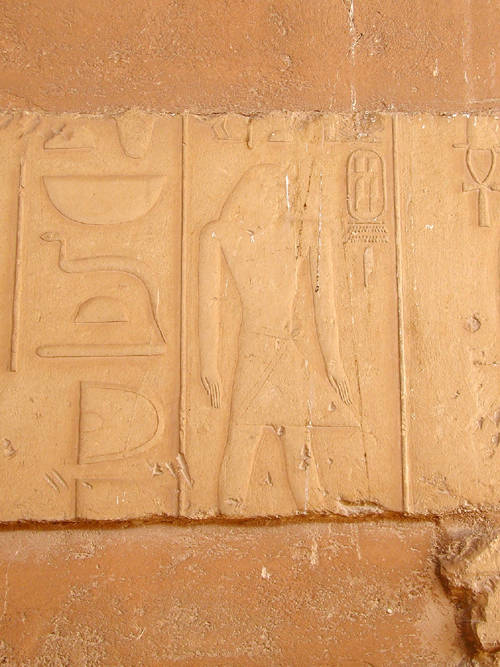
Bas-reliefs from the pyramid complex

Reconstruction of the pyramid complex, with the valley temple in the foreground

The complex consists of the main pyramid, a Ka pyramid, three queen's pyramids, a valley temple and a mortuary temple, linked by a four hundred meter long covered causeway, running through the desert from the Nile River to the pyramid.

=== Valley temple ===
The valley temple is unique for this type of structure. Located on a large quay, extending more than 150 m (490 ft) from north to south, it dominated a large harbour which once was linked to Memphis by a canal. It could be entered by two side ramps, which led to a sort of terrace, bounded by the temple facade on three sides, stretching the entire length of the quay and ending in two wings at the northern and southern ends, which had stairways built into them.

It is difficult to reconstruct the appearance of this facade because the whole structure is ruined and only the bottom few layers of stone remain. Some traces of a colonnade have been discovered, which probably indicate a long, high wall, lightly inclined at the sides, resting on two piers at the two ends of the harbour, which would have formed the heart of a pyramid town reaching all the way to the suburbs of Memphis.

The wall at the back of the terrace contained a single doorway which opened onto a large hall, with a ceiling supported by eight columns, with a series of four magazines on the south side. At the western end of the hall, there was a second hall surrounded by two further rows of magazines and a small corridor on the northern side leading to a staircase which allowed access to the temple's roof. Finally, a third hall, on the same east–west axis as the other two, led into the causeway, which ran in a southwesterly direction all the way to the mortuary temple by the pyramid.

In the ruins of this structure Gustave Jéquier discovered caskets with Pepi II's name and lids showing the king accompanied by gods who offer him the ankh, symbol of eternal life, or carry out parts of the coronation ritual. These items were clearly part of the cultic equipment of the temple.

=== Mortuary temple ===
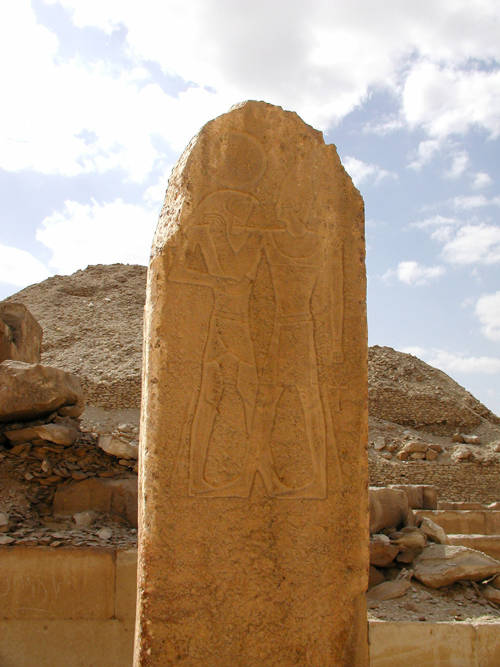
Column at the heart of the mortuary temple of the pyramid of Pepi II, showing the pharaoh being blessed by Ra

The mortuary temple consists of an entrance space which is more than 60 m (200 ft) wide on an east–west axis. From the end of the causeway to the pyramid enclosure, one passed through an entrance hall flanked by two small annexes, then a large corridor opening onto a massive ceremonial court. The court had a peristyle, consisting of eighteen quartzite pillars. The side of each of the pillars which faced the centre of the court was engraved with a representation of the king accompanied by a god and inscribed with royal protocol. The magazines flanking this courtyard could only be accessed by a long corridor at the eastern end of the courtyard. At the other end of the courtyard was a doorway leading through the wall of the pyramid enclosure into the inner part of the mortuary temple. There were five cult chapels with all the annexes necessary for their operation, and finally one came to the hall which contained the false door of Pepi II. To the south of this inner part of the mortuary temple, within the pyramid enclosure, was the ka-pyramid which was 12 m (39 ft) high.

Many fragments of the temple decoration have been recovered, allowing the reconstruction of the iconographic programme, which showed the king receiving processions of people bringing offerings and showing him leading hunts and battles against the enemies of Egypt in the presence of the high officials of the kingdom. Some representations of these enemies on round bosses have been discovered. Figures on their knees with their hands tied behind their backs were presumably dominated by statues of the king which would have been scattered in niches throughout the temple. The depiction of these enemies is identical to that found in the mortuary temple of Sahure. There are also several depictions of the god Min and of the heb-sed festival.

== The pyramid ==
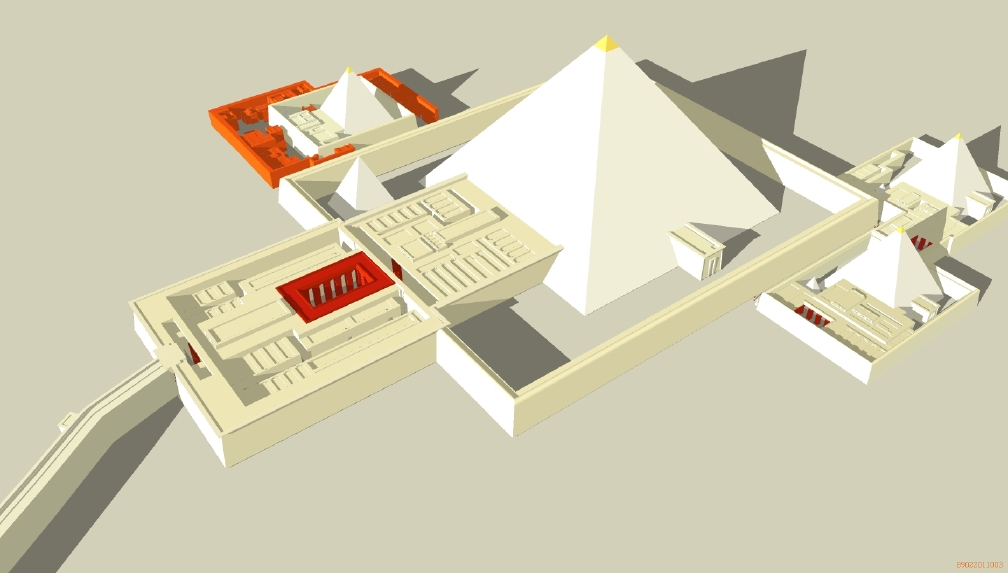
Reconstruction of the pyramid complex of Pepi II

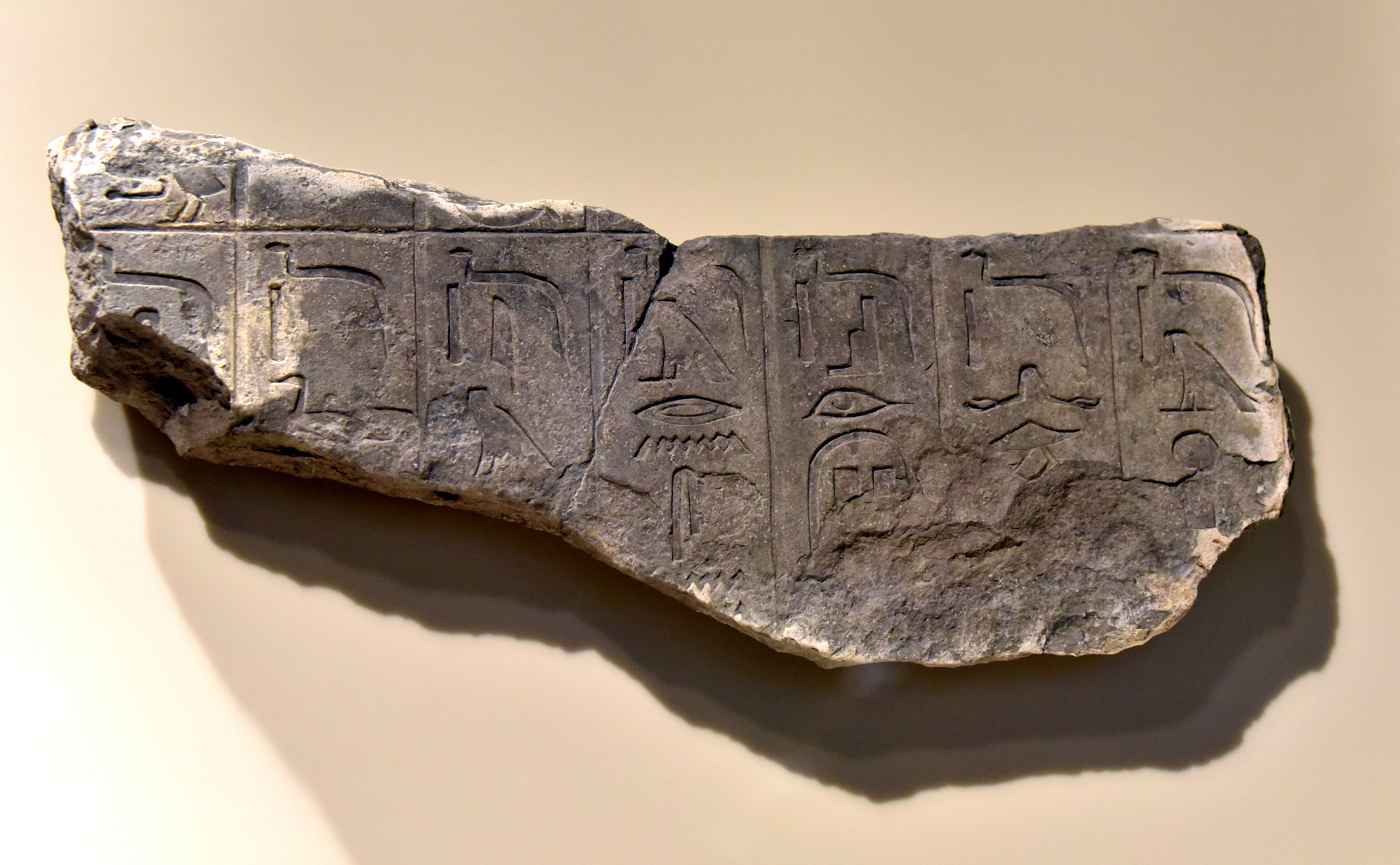
Relief fragment with spells 354 and 255 from the Pyramid Texts. From the pyramid of Pepi II at Saqqara, Egypt. Neues Museum, Berlin.

The superstructure was once composed of six steps, forming a true pyramid. Each of the steps was formed of a masonry formwork of local limestone held in place with mortar, filled with rubble of the same limestone. Each step was built on top of the one below. Once the six steps were completed, a second layer of limestone masonry filled in the gaps between the steps. This was itself covered by a cladding of fine limestone from Tura, which was partially preserved around the base of the pyramid.

The pyramid was a little over 52 m (171 ft) high and each side was over 78 m (256 ft) long. This corresponds to a hundred Egyptian cubits in height and a hundred and fifty cubits in length. On the north side of the pyramid there was a chapel which sheltered the entrance to the underground funerary chamber.

The excavations and studies of the pyramid have revealed that the construction quality was inconsistent and this caused serious structural issues, especially concerning the cladding, which threatened to crack at the base, break off, and collapse under its own extraordinary weight. The ancient architects responded to this issue by building a wall all the way around the pyramid, embedded in the paving of the enclosure, under the cladding. This wall was built from carefully dressed waste stone, which gave it enough solidity for its role as a "buttress". In the process of building this wall, they destroyed the north chapel, reusing the stone in the wall, which indicates that the buttress wall was built as a result of events subsequent to Pepi II's funeral.

It is because of this reuse of the stone that it has been possible to recover all the reliefs which initially covered the walls of the north chapel. Their iconographic programme was reconstructed by Gustave Jéquier. On the east and west walls there were large figures of the king seated on his throne in front of tables of offerings, filled by a series of servants advancing from the north wall. Framing the doorway on the north wall were images of the arrival of people with offerings, especially scenes of butchers. The south wall was dominated by a false door, with a procession of gods. This decoration is similar to that of the north chapels of other pyramid complexes, known only from small traces; the complete decoration of Pepi II's north chapel allows Egyptologists to contextualise those traces.

The substructure is similar to that of the Pyramid of Djedkare-Isesi, which was the model for all subsequent pyramids. A passageway descending from a point on the north face of the pyramid which was originally protected by the north chapel runs a little over 20 m (66 ft). It is blocked by four granite blocks at the entrance and leads to an entrance hall with a ceiling painted with five rows of white stars on a black background, oriented to the west. Then there is a horizontal corridor, itself blocked off by three granite blocks. The walls of this corridor are decorated with Pyramid Texts. It is followed by a funerary antechamber on an east–west axis and located under the very centre of the pyramid. The burial chambers were by a vault of eighteen massive stone blocks, arranged in chevrons. The ceiling of this vault was painted blue and covered with golden stars. On the eastern side of the antechamber, a doorway led to the serdab of the pyramid which has been completely destroyed.

In addition to the stars, the pyramid shows evidence that Pepi II witnessed the previous arrival of the two-tailed comet Hale–Bopp. Also known as the Great Comet of 1997, its previous appearance would have been in about 2216 BC near the end of his reign. In his pyramid is a text referring to an “nhh-star” as a companion to the pharaoh in the heavens, where “nnh” is the hieroglyph for long hair. Comet Hale-Bopp indeed appears to have long streaming hair.

The burial chamber, whose walls are covered in pyramid texts, is 3.15 m (10.3 ft) wide and nearly 8 m (26 ft) high (7.79 m (25.6 ft) at the north end, 7.91 m (26.0 ft) at the south end). The western wall of the chamber is painted with the facade of a palace.

The sarcophagus is made out of greywacke; it is nearly 3 m (9.8 ft) long, around 1.3 m (4.3 ft) wide and 1.2 m (3.9 ft) high. All four sides are engraved with hieroglyphs listing the complete royal titulary of Pepi II. The sarcophagus is a fine piece of work, but shows some traces of incompleteness with respect to the inscription, which also retains marks of preparatory guide lines and shows no signs of the gilding which was usual for a royal sarcophagus in this period. The lid of the sarcophagus is also made of greywacke and is more obviously unfinished; in places it was never smoothed and there are no traces of inscriptions. Some fragments of an alabaster chest for the canopic jars were found with the sarcophagus. The lid of this chest was also found, but is cut from a granite block - another sign of difficulty in completing the burial goods which were apparently completed in a hurry.

In addition, the decoration of the funerary chambers seems to have been abandoned abruptly, which further supports the conclusion that the structure was built in a hurry. This seems difficult to square with the long reign attributed to Pepi II. Throughout the monument, Egyptologists have revealed traces of uneven and incomplete work, as if construction had been repeatedly halted, such that the burial goods and burial chambers had to be completed in a hurry on the death of the king.

=== Pyramid Texts of Pepi II ===
Relief fragment of the Pyramid Texts from the pyramid of Pepi II at Saqqara, Egypt. Grand Egyptian Museum.

The Pyramid Texts originally appeared in the Pyramid of Unas at the end of the Fifth Dynasty initiating a tradition that carried on in the pyramids of the kings and queens of the Sixth through Eighth Dynasty, until the end of the Old Kingdom.

== The necropolis of Pepi II ==
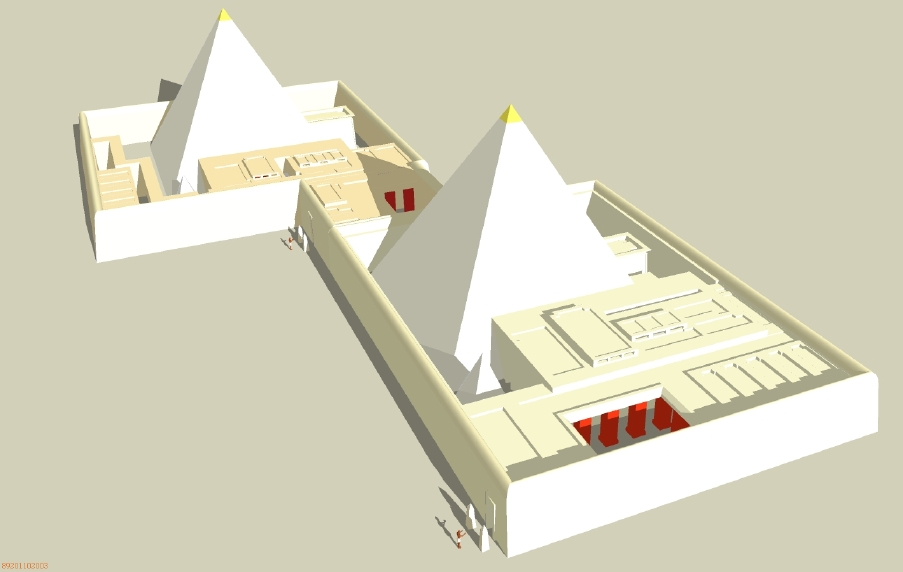
Reconstruction of the pyramids of Neith and Iput II, located to the north and north west of the king's pyramid

Like all the royal pyramid complexes, Pepi II's pyramid sat at the heart of a necropolis in which his family members and court officials built their own tombs, in order to follow their king into the afterlife.

As part of this necropolis, three queen's pyramids have been identified, all given independent cult complexes. These miniature pyramid complexes have all the elements necessary for the funerary cult of royal wives at the end of the 6th dynasty. They are the:

- Pyramid of Wedjebten to the southeast of Pepi II's pyramid complex,
- Pyramid of Neith, to the northwest of the royal pyramid complex
- Pyramid of Iput II, also to the northwest.

== See also ==
- List of Egyptian pyramids
- Egyptian pyramid construction techniques

== Bibliography ==
- Gaston Maspero, La pyramide du roi Pépi II, Récents travaux à Saqqarâ XII & XIV, 1892–1893
- Gustave Jéquier, Le monument funéraire de Pépi II, volume 1: Le tombeau royal, 1936; volume 2: Le temple, 1938; volume 3: Les approches du temple, 1940 - IFAO
- Jean-Philippe Lauer: Die Königsgräber von Memphis. Grabungen in Sakkara. Lübbe, Bergisch Gladbach 1988, ISBN 3-7857-0528-X.
- Rainer Stadelmann: Die ägyptischen Pyramiden. von Zabern, Mainz 1991, ISBN 3-8053-1142-7, pp. 196–203.
- Miroslav Verner: Die Pyramiden. Rowohlt, Reinbek 1997, ISBN 3-499-60890-1, pp. 399–405.
- Mark Lehner: Geheimnis der Pyramiden. Orbis, München 1999, ISBN 3-572-01039-X, pp. 161–163.
- Jean-Pierre Adam & Christiane Ziegler, Les pyramides d'Égypte, 1999
- Audran Labrousse, L'architecture des pyramides à textes, volume 2. Saqqara Sud, Mission Archéologique de Saqqara III, 2000 - IFAO
- Zahi Hawass: Die Schätze der Pyramiden. Weltbildverlag, Augsburg 2004, ISBN 3-8289-0809-8, pp. 272–275.
