= Ankhesenpepi IV =

Sixth Dynasty Egyptian queen

< p p i i > S34 n Aa1 n s

Queen consort of Egypt
- Tenure: c. 2250 BC
- King: Pepi II
- Burial: Badrashin, Giza, Egypt
- Spouse: Pepi II
- Issue: Neferkare
- Dynasty: 6th Dynasty

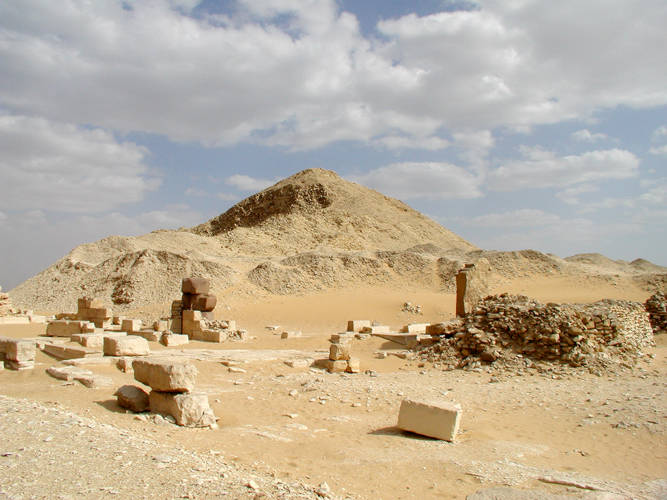
Ruins of the Pyramid of Pepi II, near which Ankhesenpepi IV was buried - in the mortuary temple of Queen Iput II

Ankhesenpepi IV (fl. c. 2250 BC) was an ancient Egyptian queen, a wife of King Pepi II of the Sixth Dynasty. She was the mother of the crown prince Neferkare. Pepi II also had several other wives.

== Titles ==
Her titles were: King's Mother of Ankh-djed-Neferkare (mwt-niswt-‘nkh-djd-nfr-k3-r’), Mother of the Dual King (mwt-niswt-biti), King’s Wife of Men-ankh-Neferkare (ḥmt-niswt-mn-‘nḫ-nfr-k3-r’), King's Wife, his beloved (ḥmt-niswt mryt.f), This God's Daughter (z3t-nṯr-tw), Foster Child of Wadjet (sḏtit-w3ḏt).

== Tomb ==
Sarcophagus of Ankhesenpepi IV, as found, in a storeroom of the mortuary temple of Queen Iput II

Ankhesenpepi IV was buried in Saqqara. They must have lacked the resources needed for a burial since she did not have a pyramid built for her. Her sarcophagus, which was made of reused stone, was found in a storeroom belonging to the mortuary temple of Queen Iput II. The lid of the sarcophagus was made of basalt.

It's proposed that the pyramid of Qakare Ibi was originally that of Ankhnespepi IV and was only later appropriated by Ibi, given that It is very similar in plan, dimensions and decorations to the pyramids of the queens of Pepi II, the last great pharaoh of the Old Kingdom.
