= South Saqqara Stone =

Ancient Egyptian sarcophagus lid

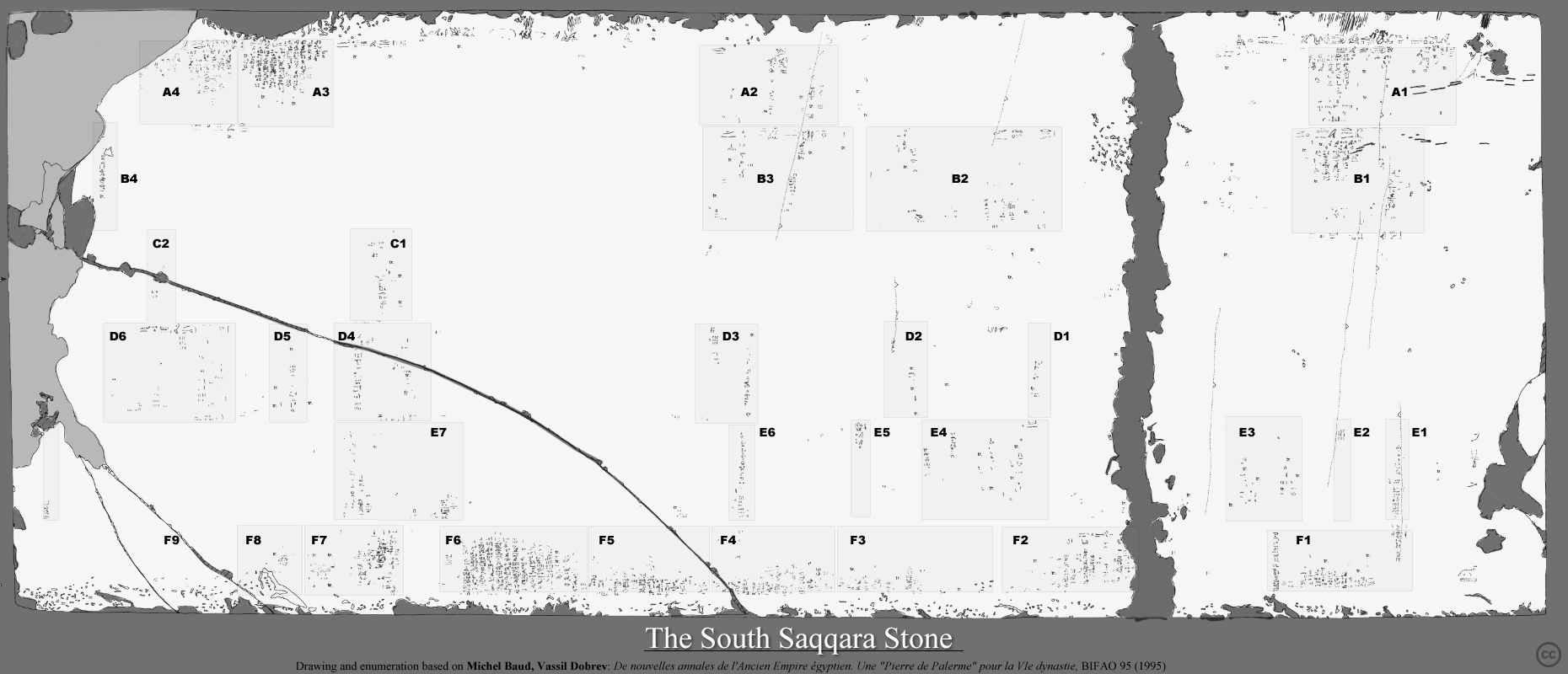
- Material: Basalt
- Size: length: 2.43 m width: 920 cm
- Created: c. 2250 BC
- Discovered: 1932 or 1933; Giza, Egypt
- Discovered by: Gustave Jequier

The South Saqqara Stone is the lid of the sarcophagus of the ancient Egyptian queen Ankhesenpepi IV, which was inscribed with a list for the reigns of the pharaohs of the 6th Dynasty from Teti, Userkare, Pepi I, Merenre to the early years of Pepi II under whom the document was likely created. It is essentially an annal document which records events in each year of a king's reign. An estimated 92% of the original text was lost when the stone was roughly polished to be reused as a sarcophagus lid, possibly in the late first intermediate to early Middle Kingdom period (c. 2050 – 1650 BC).

== Discovery ==
South Saqqara Stone, as the lid of the Sarcophagus of Ankhesenpepi IV, as found, in a storeroom of the mortuary temple of Queen Iput II

The South Saqqara Stone was discovered in 1932 or 1933 by Gustave Jéquier in the westernmost of five storerooms south of the pyramid of Queen Iput II, within the pyramid complex of Pepi II (during whose reign it was created) at Saqqara. The stone was found being used as the Sarcophagus of Ankhesenpepi IV.

== Description ==
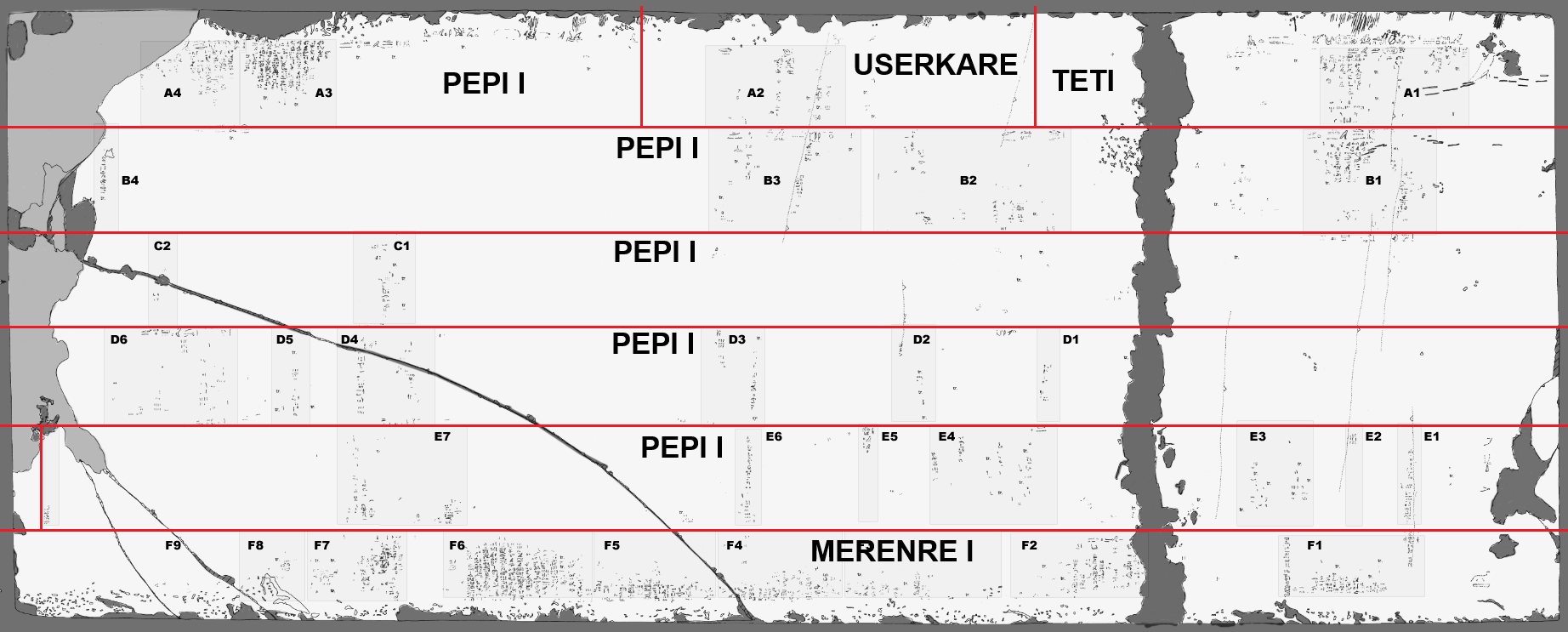
Names and positions of Pharaohs on the South Saqqara Stone.

Made of basalt, it measures 2.43 metres by 0.92 metres and is 20 centimetres thick. It is inscribed on both sides, but much of the inscription is erased and unreadable. The recto appears to list events of the reigns of Teti, Userkare, Pepi I and Merenre, and some inscriptions are readable despite the erasure. The verso describes the second part of the reign of Merenre and part of Pepi II's, but nearly all inscriptions are erased and unreadable.

== Significance ==
The importance of the South Saqqara Stone stems from its inscription: a list of a number of pharaohs, along with details of annual or biannual cattle counts which confirm details in other sources (such as the Turin King List), and allow archaeologists to estimate the length of their reigns. Michel Baud and Vassil Dobrev estimate at least 12 years of reign for Teti, 2–4 years for Userkare, 49–50 years for Pepi I and, at least, 11–13 years for Merenre based on an estimate on the size of the preserved year the size of each year blocks and the location of certain cattle counts (such as the Year of the 18th and 25th counts for Pepi I and his Year after the 23rd count, or the Year of and the Year after the 2nd count for Merenre) within this document.

The Stone is considered one of the earliest historical documents in existence, as it is not merely a list of dynastic ancestors for the ruling pharaoh, but includes the names of all preceding pharaohs known to the artefact's creators, including enigmatic rulers such as Userkare.

== See also ==
- Palermo Stone
- Saqqara King List
