= Merenre =

N5 U6 r n
Merenre
in hieroglyphs
Era: Old Kingdom
(2686–2181 BC)

Merenre (Ancient Egyptian: mr.n-rꜥ) is an Ancient Egyptian name meaning "(the one) whom Ra has loved". It has sometimes been suggested that the Greek Μενθεσοῦφις (Menthesouphis) is a rendering of this name, but it may more likely be a metathesized rendering of the name nmtj-m-zꜣ.f. Merenre is the throne name of two pharaohs of the 6th Dynasty during the late Old Kingdom period:

- Pharaoh Merenre Nemtyemsaf I (2283–2278 BC),
- Pharaoh Merenre Nemtyemsaf II (2184–2183 BC), grandson of Merenre I

== See also ==
- Pyramid of Merenre, burial pyramid of pharaoh Merenre I.
