= Meritites IV =

mr r t t f s
Mrj.t jt=s

Queen consort of Egypt
- Tenure: c. 2250 BC
- King: Pepi II
- Burial: Badrashin, Giza, Egypt
- Spouse: Pepi II
- Father: Pepi I

Meritites IV (also known as Meritites II as she was the second queen by that name; fl. c. 2250 BC) was a queen consort from the Sixth Dynasty. She was believed to be a wife of Pepi I, but her title of King's Daughter of his body of Pepy-Mennefer (s3t-niswt-nt-kht.f-ppy-mn-nfr) is now understood to indicate that she was a daughter of Pepi I Meryre and wife of a king Neferkare, presumably Pepi II. One more evidence for that theory is that her name means "Beloved of her father".

== Titles ==
Her titles include: Great one of the hetes-sceptre, She who sees Horus and Seth (m33t-hrw-stsh), Great of Praises (wrt-hzwt), King's Wife (hmt-nisw), King's Wife, his beloved (hmt-nisw meryt.f), and Companion of Horus (smrt-hrw).

== Burial ==
Meritites IV was buried in Saqqara. Her pyramid lies to the south of the pyramid of Pepi I. Meritites' pyramid lies to the southwest of the complex of Queen Inenek-Inti and to the south of the queen's pyramid referred to as the "Southwestern pyramid".
