= Nitocris =

Egyptian queen of dubious existence

- Nitocret

Pharaoh
- Predecessor: Merenre Nemtyemsaf II
- Successor: Menkare if she is to be identified with Netjerkare
Royal titulary
Nomen
If she is to be identified with Neitiqerty Siptah, then:
Neitiqerty Siptah
Nt-jqr.tj sꜣ-ptḥ
Neith is excellent, the son of Ptah
G39 N5 < n t Z5 i q r t Z4 R13 > R13 G39 Z1 R13 t p V28 R13
- Consort: Merenre Nemtyemsaf II (according to legend)
- Father: Pepi II (?)
- Mother: Neith (?)
- Dynasty: Sixth Dynasty

Nitocris (Greek: Νίτωκρις, Nitōkris) was possibly the last queen of the Sixth Dynasty of Ancient Egypt. Her name is found in writings long considered as relatively accurate resources: a major chronological documentation of the reigns of the kings of ancient Egypt that was composed in the third-century BC by Manetho, an Ancient Egyptian priest; and by the ancient Greek historian, Herodotus, in his Histories (430 BC). She is thought to be the daughter of Pepi II and Neith and to be the sister of Merenre Nemtyemsaf II.

Her historicity has been questioned by some with speculation that, if she was a historical ruler, she may have been a regent. Another view, by the Egyptologist Kim Ryholt, argues that Nitocris is legendary and derives from the historical king Neitiqerty Siptah who succeeded Nitocris's brother, Merenre Nemtyemsaf II, at the transition between the Old Kingdom and First Intermediate Period.

Manetho claimed she built the "third pyramid" at Giza. Modern historians and archaeologists attribute that pyramid to a king of the Fourth Dynasty, Menkaure.

== Greek tradition ==
According to Herodotus (5th century BC), Nitocris invited the murderers of her brother, a "king of Egypt", to a banquet, then killed them by flooding the sealed room with the waters of the Nile, then committed suicide to escape retribution.

After him came three hundred and thirty kings, whose names the priests recited from a papyrus roll. In all these many generations there were eighteen Ethiopian kings, and one queen, native to the country; the rest were all Egyptian men. The name of the queen was the same as that of the Babylonian princess, Nitōkris. She, to avenge her brother (he was king of Egypt and was slain by his subjects, who then gave Nitōkris the sovereignty) put many of the Egyptians to death by guile. She built a spacious underground chamber; then, with the pretence of handselling it, but with far other intent in her mind, she gave a great feast, inviting to it those Egyptians whom she knew to have been most concerned in her brother's murder; and while they feasted she let the river in upon them by a great and secret channel. This was all that the priests told of her, save that also when she had done this she cast herself into a chamber full of hot ashes, thereby to escape vengeance. (Herodotus, Histories 2.100)

In Africanus' epitome of Manetho (3rd century BC), Nitocris appears as a queen regnant, the successor of Menthesouphis (perhaps the brother mentioned by Herodotus) and thus sixth and last monarch of the Sixth Dynasty:

5. Menthesouphis, for 1 year.

6. Nitōkris, the noblest and loveliest of the women of her time, of fair complexion, the builder of the third pyramid, reigned for 12 years.

Total, 203 years... (Manetho, Aegyptiaca apud Africanus, fragment 20)

== Egyptian records ==
The name Nitocris is not mentioned in any known native Egyptian inscriptions and it was long thought that this monarch appears under her Egyptian name of Neitiqreti (nt-ỉqrtỉ) on a fragment of the Turin King List, dated to the Nineteenth Dynasty. The fragment where this name appears is part of the list's coverage of the Sixth Dynasty, thus appearing to confirm the records of both Manetho and Herodotus. Comparison to the Abydos King List suggested that the name Neitiqreti is a faulty transcription of the prenomen of King Netjerkare, named at Abydos as the successor of the Sixth Dynasty King Nemtyemsaf II. On the Abydos King List, Netjerkare appears to occupy the same spot as Neitiqreti does on the Turin King List.

Turin King List as restored by Kim Ryholt in 2000, joining fragment 40 to 43:

5.6 King [Nemtyemsaf] 1 year, 1 month
5.7 King Neitiqreti Siptah, [He] acted [in kingship ... years, ... months, ... days
(lacuna in the king list's source/Vorlage, specified as 6 years in the dynastic total at 5.14–15)
5.8 King Neferka Khered-Sonbe, [... years, ... months, ... days] (incomplete/mistake for Neferkare Pepy-Sonbe)

The 2022 reconstruction (by a team including Ryholt) of the Turin King List at the Museo Egizio in Turin separated fragment 40 from 43 and placed it as an extension of fragment 108 instead, in column 10 of the king list. This leaves the Turin King List entries for the end of the Sixth Dynasty as:

5.6 King [Nemtyemsaf] 1 year, 1 month
5.7 King Neitiqreti ...
(lacuna in the king list's source/Vorlage, specified as 6 years in the dynastic total at 5.14–15)
5.8 King Neferka Khered ...

Abydos King List:

39 King Merenre Djefaemsaf (mistake for Ankhkare Nemtyemsaf II)
40 King Netjerkare
41 King Menkare
42 King Neferkare
43 King Neferkare Neby
44 King Djedkare Shemai
45 King Neferkare Khendu
46 King Merenhor
47 King Seneferka (mistake for Neferkamen)
48 King Nykare
49 King Neferkare Tereru
50 King Neferkahor
51 King Neferkare Pepy-Sonbe

If Neitiqreti was a male king, he would correspond to the Netjerkare of the Abydos King List. However, if Neitiqreti was a queen regnant after all, she would probably be distinct from Netjerkare, as the Abydos King List appears to have omitted queens regnant.

== In modern fiction ==
- Two letters in the name are transposed in Bolesław Prus' 1895 historical novel Pharaoh, where "Nikotris" appears as the mother of the protagonist, Pharaoh "Ramses XIII" (there were only eleven or twelve pharaohs of that name).
- The Queen's Enemies, a play by Lord Dunsany, is based upon the account by Herodotus of the murderous activities of Nitocris.
- Nitocris is mentioned in two stories by H. P. Lovecraft, "The Outsider" and "Imprisoned with the Pharaohs". She is mentioned only in passing and portrayed as evil and reigning over ghouls and other horrors.
- Tennessee Williams' first published work is the 1928 short story "The Vengeance of Nitocris", detailing her careful plan for revenge. She makes the people who slew her brother die in a fitting way.
- Le Basalte Bleu, a book by John Knittel, has a sort of time-travel plot in which the main character falls in love with the ancient ruler. Knittel speculates that the origin of the Cinderella fairy tale lies in the marriage of Nitocris, who lost her golden sandal only to have it later found by the pharaoh.
- Nitocris La Dame de Memphis is a book by Pierre Montlaur.
- "The Mirror of Nitocris", a short story by Brian Lumley, features a mirror that once belonged to Nitocris that unleashes evil forces upon its owners.
  - This mirror also appears in Demonbane, as one of the Page Monsters created by the missing pages of Al-Azif; Nya (an avatar of Nyarlathotep) gives it to one of the children in the orphanage, in order to stir up trouble.
- Nitocris is royal wife of Merenra II in the novel Rhodopis of Nubia by Nobel laureate Naguib Mahfouz, which tells the fateful love story of Pharaoh Merenra II (successor to Pepi II, Sixth Dynasty) and the courtesan Rhodopis.
- Karl Sanders has a song called "Slavery Unto Nitokris" on his second solo album, Saurian Exorcisms.
- "By Scarab and Scorpion", a short story featuring the Green Hornet by Mark Ellis, features a plot involving an Egyptian museum exhibition featuring Nitocris.
- The title song from Celtic Frost's 1985 album Morbid Tales is based on the legend of Nitocris.
- Nitocris appears in The Mummy and Miss Nitocris by George Griffith, where she is the namesake of an Egyptologist's daughter in whose person she is reincarnated.
- Nitocris appears in Fate/Grand Order as a Caster-class, an Assassin-class and later an Avenger-class Servant with ties to Horus, Medjed, and Anubis. As Servants are influenced by fictional interpretations of their legends, Nitocris' powers are mostly based on Lovecraft and Lumley's stories about her, and she wields the titular mirror from the latter as her weapon.
- A character named Nitocris appears in the Assassin's Creed Origins tie in novel, Desert Oath. She is the God's Wife of Amun in Karnak temple and mother of Isidora. Her death between the novel and the events of the Curse of the Pharaohs DLC give Isidora motivation to use an Apple of Eden to bring about the wrath of the undead on Thebes.
- Nitocris is the subject of the opera Nitocri by Saverio Mercadante, premiered in Turin in 1824.

== Bibliography ==
- Callender, Vivienne G. 2011. "Queen Neit-ikrety/Nitocris," Abusir and Saqqara in the Year 2010, vol. 1, Prague: 246–260.
- Callender, Vivienne G. 2012. In Hathor's Image I: The Wives and Mothers of Egyptian Kings from Dynasties I-VI. Prague.
- Cooney, Kathlyn M. 2022. "Finding Nitocris: Patterns of Female Rule at the End of Egypt's Old Kingdom," in: Betsy Bryan et al., eds., One Who Loves Knowledge. Studies in Honor of Richard Jasnow. Columbus, Georgia: 33–42.
- Godley, A.D., transl. 1920. Herodotus vol. 1: The Persian Wars, Books I–II, Loeb Classical Library 117, Cambridge, MA.
- Gudacker, R. 2015. "Das Fragment Ägyptisches Museum Berlin No 1116 als Teil einer bisland verkannten Königsliste: 'Die Königsliste von Abusir'," Wiener Zeitschrift für die Kunde des Morgenlandes 105: 33–66.
- Hitchcock, Francesca M. 1995. "Tennessee Williams's "Vengeance of Nitocris": The Keynote to Future Works," The Mississippi Quarterly 48: 595–608.
- Newberry, Percy Edward. 1943. "Queen Nitocris of the Sixth Dynasty," Journal of Egyptian Archaeology 29: 51–54.
- Papazian, Hratch. 2015. "The State of Egypt in the Eighth Dynasty," in: P. D. Manuelian and T. Schneider, eds., Towards a new history for the Egyptian Old Kingdom, Leiden: 393–428.
- Ryholt, Kim S. B. 2000. "The Late Old Kingdom in the Turin King-list and the identity of Nitocris," Zeitschrift für Ägyptische Sprache und Altertumskunde 127: 87–100.
- Stasser, Thierry. 2007. "Deux reines Ankhnespépy pour Pépy II Neferkarê?," Res Antiquae 14: 1–14.
- Waddell, W.G., transl. 1940. Manetho, Loeb Classical Library 350, Cambridge, MA.
- Zivie-Coche, Christiane M. 1972. "Nitocris, Rhodopis et la troisième pyramide de Giza," Bulletin de l’Institut français d’archéologie orientale 72:115–138. PDF
