= Udjebten =

Egyptian queen consort

V24 b N20 t n

Queen consort of Egypt
- Tenure: c. 2250 BC
- King: Pepi II
- Burial: Badrashin, Giza, Egypt
- Spouse: Pepi II

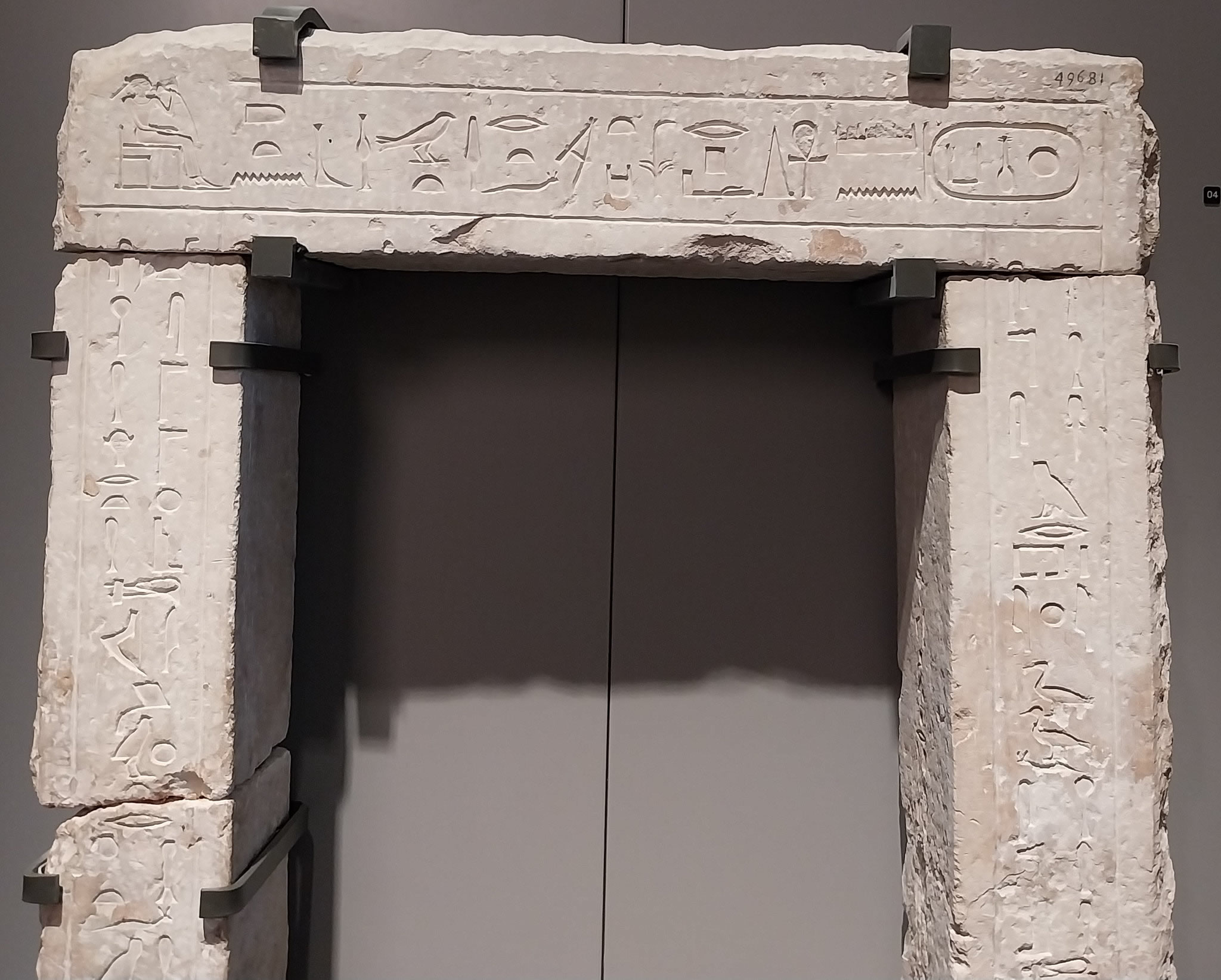
Door frame from the pyramid of queen Udjebten with her names and titles

Udjebten or Wedjebten (fl. c. 2250 BC) was an ancient Egyptian queen consort, a wife of King Pepi II of the Sixth Dynasty.

== Titles ==
Her titles include that of Hereditary Princess (ỉrỉỉ.t-pˁt), which indicates she was of noble birth.

All other titles known for Wedjebten are related to her role as wife of the king: She who sees Horus and Seth (m33.t-ḥrw-stš), Great one of the hetes-sceptre (wr.t-ḥts), King's Wife (ḥm.t-nỉswt), Beloved King's Wife of Men-ankh-Neferkare (ḥm.t-nỉswt mrỉỉ.t=f mn-ˁnḫ-nfr-k3-rˁ), Attendant of Horus (ḫt-ḥrw), Consort of the Beloved of the Two Ladies (zm3.t mrỉỉ-nb.tỉ).

None of her titles state that she was a King's Daughter, so she may not have been a sister to king Pepi II like his other wives Neith and Iput II.

== Burial ==
Exposed burial chamber of the pyramid of queen Udjebten with the Pyramid Texts visible

Wedjebten was buried in a pyramid in Saqqara. Her pyramid complex included a pyramid, a small mortuary temple and a cult pyramid. Wedjebten's complex was surrounded by two perimeter walls. An inscription found at the sites mentions that the top of Wedjebten's pyramid was encased in gold. The walls of her burial chamber were lined with a set of Pyramid Texts.
