= Iput II =

Egyptian queen consort

i p w t

Queen consort of Egypt
- Tenure: c. 2250 BC
- King: Pepi II
- Burial: Badrashin, Giza, Egypt
- Spouse: Pepi II

Iput (fl. c. 2250 BC) was an ancient Egyptian queen consort of the Sixth Dynasty, a sister and wife of Pepi II.

== Titles ==
Her titles King's Daughter (z.t-nỉswt), and Eldest King's Daughter (z.t-nỉswt-šms.t) show that Iput II was a daughter of a king, either Pepi I or Merenre Nemtyemsaf I. The title Hereditary Princess (ỉrỉỉ.t-pˁt) identifies her as a noble lady.

As a queen consort, she held the following titles: King's Wife (ḥm.t-nỉswt ), King's Wife, his beloved (ḥm.t-nỉswt mrỉỉ.t=f), Beloved King's Wife of Neferkare-men-ankh (ḥm.t-nỉswt mrỉỉ.t=f nfr-k3-rˁ-mn-ˁnḫ), Beloved King's Wife of Neferkare-men-ankh-Neferkare (ḥm.t-nỉswt mrỉỉ.t=f nfr-k3-rˁ-mn-ˁnḫ-nfr-k3-rˁ), and She who sees Horus and Seth (m33.t-ḥrw-stš).

== Burial ==
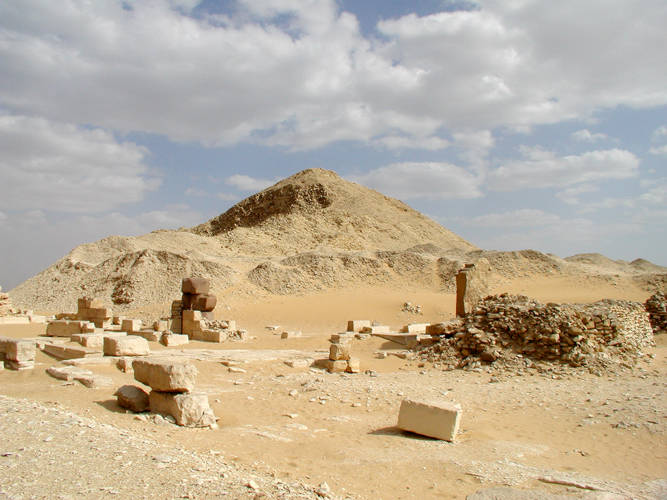
Pyramid of Pepi II with smaller pyramids for the queens Neith, Iput II, and Udjebten

Iput's pyramid complex consisted of a pyramid and a small mortuary temple. The temple was built in an L-shape. She was buried close to Pepi II at Saqqara and her tomb contains a version of the Pyramid Texts.

In one of the storerooms of the mortuary temple, excavators discovered the granite sarcophagus of Queen Ankhesenpepi IV, another wife of Pepi II. It is not entirely clear if Ankhesenpepi IV was originally buried in the burial complex of Iput II, or if she was originally interred elsewhere and reburied during the First Intermediate Period.

The lid of Ankhesenpepi's sarcophagus is inscribed with an interesting historical text which sheds some light on the history of the early part of the 6th dynasty. The text inscribed on the sarcophagus lid has been very hard to decipher but at least partial translations have been possible. From the text it is now clear that Userkare reigned some four years, but the practice of damnatio memoriae later led to his name being expunged from the records.
