= Neith (wife of Pepi II) =

Ancient Egyptian Queen

n t R25

Queen consort of Egypt
- King: Pepi II
- Burial: Badrshein, Giza, Egypt
- Spouse: Pepi II

Neith was an ancient Egyptian queen consort, one of the principal queens of the Old Kingdom king Pepi II, who ruled (c. 2278 BC – c. 2184 BC). Queen Neith was named after goddess Neith.

== Family ==
Neith is thought to have been a daughter of the king Pepi I and queen Ankhesenpepi I, making her aunt and cousin to king Pepi II. Neith may be the mother of King Nemtyemsaf II. There is a legend about Queen Nitocris who, if she indeed existed at all, may have been a daughter of Neith.

== Titles ==
Her titles as a royal daughter include: King's Daughter (zȝt-nswt), Eldest King's Daughter of his body (zȝt-nswt-smswt-n-ẖt.f), Eldest King's Daughter of his body of Mennefer-Meryre (zȝt-nswt-smswt-n-ẖt.f-mn-nfr-mry-rˁ), and Hereditary Princess (jryt-pˁt).

As a wife of the king, she used the titles: King's Wife (hmt-nisw), Beloved King's Wife of Men-ankh-Neferkare (ḥmt-nsw mryt.f-mn-ˁnḫ-nfr-kȝ-rˁ), Great of Praises (wrt-ḥzwt), Great one of the hetes-sceptre (wrt-hetes), She who sees Horus and Seth (mȝȝt-ḥrw-stẖ), Attendant of Horus (ḫt-ḥrw), Consort and beloved of the Two Ladies (smȝyt-mry-nbty), Companion of Horus (tjst-ḥrw), and Companion of Horus (smrt-ḥrw).

Neith's title King's Mother (mwt-nswt) shows that she was the mother of a king.

== Burial ==
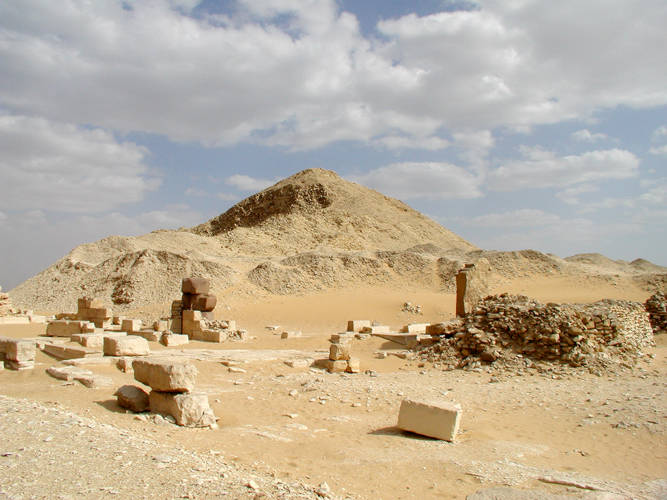
Pyramid of Pepi II with smaller pyramids for the queens Neith, Iput II and Udjebten

Of the three small pyramid complexes built around that of the chief pyramid of Pepi II, Neith's is the largest. Neith's pyramid may have been the first one constructed among the queen's pyramids associated with Pepi II. Neith's pyramid complex included a small temple, a satellite pyramid and a fleet of sixteen small model wooden boats buried between the main and satellite pyramid. The entrance to the enclosure was flanked by two inscribed obelisks. Neith's burial chamber was inscribed with Pyramid Texts. This is the second known occurrence of these texts in a queen's pyramid, the first being those of Ankhenespepy II. The burial chamber contained a red granite sarcophagus (empty) and a canopic chest.

The remains of at least part of her mummy were uncovered and were once housed in the Qasr el-Aini Medical School.
