= Ramesses =

Ramesses or Ramses or Rameses may refer to:

== Ancient Egypt ==
=== Pharaohs of the nineteenth dynasty ===
- Ramesses I (Menpehtyre Rameses), founder of the 19th Dynasty
- Ramesses II (Wosermaatre-setepenre Rameses-meryamun), also called "Ramesses the Great," grandson of the preceding
  - Prince Ramesses (prince), second son of Ramesses II
  - Prince Ramesses-Meryamun-Nebweben, a son of Ramesses II
- Siptah, last male king of the Dynasty, originally named Sekhaenre-setepenre Rameses-Siptah, subsequently renamed Akhenre-setepenre Siptah-Merneptah, for which reason he is not numbered as a "Ramesses," probably great-grandson of Ramesses II

=== Pharaohs of the twentieth dynasty ===
- Ramesses III (Wosermaatre-meryamun Rameses-heqaon), son of Sethnakhte and adversary of the Libyans and Sea Peoples
- Ramesses IV (Heqamaatre-setepenamun Rameses-heqamaat-meryamun), son of preceding
- Ramesses V (Wosermaatre-sekheperenre Rameses-Amenhirkhepshef-meryamun), son of preceding
- Ramesses VI (Nebmaatre-meryamun Rameses-Amenhirkhepshef-netjerheqaon), uncle of preceding
- Ramesses VII (Wosermaatre-setepenre-meryamun Rameses-Itamun-netjerheqaon), son of preceding
- Ramesses VIII (Wosermaatre-akhenamun Rameses-Sethirkhepshef-meryamun), uncle of preceding
- Ramesses IX (Neferkare-setepenre Rameses-Khaemwaset-mereramun), nephew of preceding?
- Ramesses X (Khepermaatre-meryamun Rameses-Amenhirkhepshef-meryamun), son of preceding?
- Ramesses XI (Menmaatre-setepenptah Rameses-Khaemwaset-mereramun-netjerheqaon), son of preceding?
- Ramesses XII (Wosermaatre-heqawaset Rameses-mereramun), son of preceding?

=== Locations ===
- Pi-Ramesses, founded by pharaoh Ramesses II on the former site of Avaris

== Books ==
- The Mummy, or Ramses the Damned, a novel by Anne Rice
- The Ramses (Ramsès) series of five best-selling historical novels, by French author and Egyptologist Christian Jacq

== Entertainers and artists ==
- Albert Marchinsky, an illusionist whose stage name was "The Great Rameses"
- Ramases, an early-1970s-era British musician
- Ramsés VII, pseudonym used by Argentine singer-songwriter Tanguito (1945-1972)
- Ramesses (band), an English sludge/doom metal band, formed by ex-Electric Wizard members Tim Bagshaw and Mark Greening
- Ramses Shaffy (1933–2009), Dutch singer
- Ramses Younan (1913–1966), Egyptian painter and writer

== Fictional characters ==
- King Ramses, a minor villain in the animated cartoon Courage the Cowardly Dog
- Walter 'Ramses' Emerson, a fictional character in the Amelia Peabody series by Elizabeth Peters
- Ramses XIII, protagonist of the 1895 historical novel Pharaoh by Bolesław Prus

== Military ==
- MV Ramses, a German blockade runner sunk by HMAS Adelaide in 1942
- The Ramses II tank, an Egyptian main battle tank

== Other uses ==
- Ramses, a brand of condom manufactured by Durex
- Ramses (spacecraft) (Rapid Apophis Mission for Space Safety), the proposed space mission by the European Space Agency to rendezvous with the asteroid 99942 Apophis
- Rameses (mascot), the mascot for the University of North Carolina at Chapel Hill
- Ramses Exchange, telecoms building in downtown Cairo
