= Cattle count =

Basis for taxation in ancient Egypt

In ancient Egypt, the cattle count was one of the two main means of evaluating the amount of taxes to be levied, the other one being the height of the annual inundation (the flooding of the nile). A very important economic event, the cattle count was controlled by high officials, and was connected to several cultic feasts. In addition it served as a means of dating other events, with the entire year when it occurred being called "year of the Xth cattle count under the person of the king Y". The frequency of cattle counts varied through the history of ancient Egypt; in the Old Kingdom it was most likely biennial, i.e. occurring every two years, and became more frequent subsequently.

== Process and purpose ==
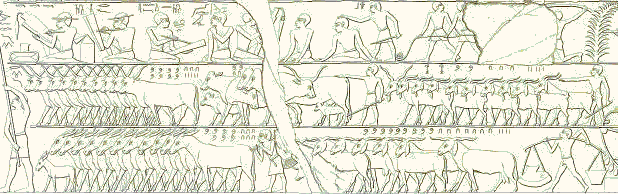
Cattle count after a relief in Mastaba tomb G75 at Giza.

To perform the cattle count, all chattel (including productive livestock such as cows and oxen, sheep, pigs, goats and donkeys) were rounded up and counted. Following the count, the percentage of chattel to be taxed by the state would be calculated. The cattle count was performed in every nome of Egypt. Fraud was harshly punished. From the 2nd Dynasty onwards, the cattle count was connected with the "Following of Horus" (Egypt. Shemsu Hor) which occurred every two years. The Shemsu Hor consisted of a journey by the king and his court throughout Egypt which facilitated the assessment and levying of taxes by the central administration.

== Importance ==
The cattle count is of great importance to Egyptologists and historians, because many inscriptions report the year of the x-th occasion of the cattle count followed by the name of a pharaoh. Thus these inscriptions are used to assess the minimum duration of the reign of the pharaoh, for example assuming that the cattle count was held every two years. This last point being of paramount importance for correct datation of reign lengths, it is highly disputed up to this day. According to the Palermo stone, a black basalt stone slab recording the yearly events of cultic and religious nature from king Narmer (1st Dynasty) down to king Neferirkare Kakai (3rd pharaoh of the 5th Dynasty), the cattle count was performed every second year until the late Old Kingdom. After this period, however, it was performed more frequently and finally yearly. The first pharaoh during whose reign yearly cattle counts are known to have taken place with certainty is king Pepi I of the 6th Dynasty. This does not exclude that the cattle count necessarily took place every second year before Pepi I.

An example of conflicting evaluations for a reign duration via cattle count is the case of king Khufu (4th Dynasty). The highest known numbers of cattle counts under Khufu are found in workmen's graffiti inside the relieving chambers of the Khufu pyramid. The ink inscription reports the "17th occasion of the cattle count". Since the Palermo stone inscriptions hold that the cattle count was performed every second year during the 4th Dynasty, it would prove that Khufu ruled at least 34 years. This calculation is rejected by several Egyptologists, because another ancient Egyptian source, the Turin canon, credits Khufu with a reign of merely 23 years. At the opposite, the ancient Greek historian Herodotus claims that Khufu ruled for 50 years, which is now seen as an exaggeration. Meanwhile, today Egyptologists such as Thomas Schneider assume that either Khufu indeed ruled for a little over 34 years, or that the author of the Turin canon simply did not take into account the 2-year-cycle of cattle counts and in fact credits Khufu with 23 cattle counts, which is a reign of 46 years.

== See also ==
- South Saqqara Stone
