= Merenre Nemtyemsaf II =

Egyptian pharaoh

- Menthesouphis (Africanus after Manetho), Antyemsaf
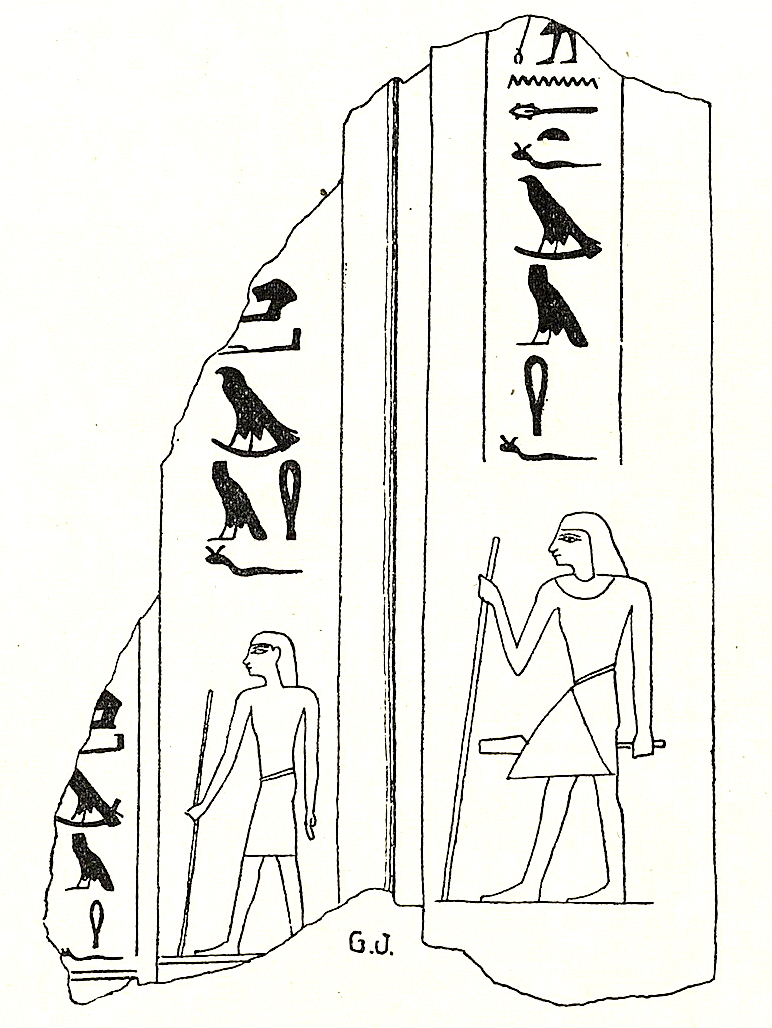
- A false door fragment depicting Nemtyemsaf II from the Pyramid Neith, who may be his mother

Pharaoh
- Reign: Around 1 year and 1 month, c. 2214 – c. 2213 BC (Note: 2194 BC, 2184 BC, 2180 BC, 2152 BC)
- Predecessor: Pepi II
- Successor: Possibly Netjerkare Siptah
Royal titulary
Prenomen
Merenre Nemtyemsaf
Mr-n-Rˁ-Nmti-m-s3.f
Beloved of Ra, Nemty is his protection

M23 X1 L2 X1	N5 mr n G42 m V16 f
Nomen
Nemtyemsaf
Nmti-m-s3.f
Nemty is his protection

G39 N5	G7A m V18 f
- Father: Pepi II
- Mother: Possibly Neith
- Died: c. 2213 BC
- Dynasty: 6th Dynasty

Merenre Nemtyemsaf II (died c. 2213 BC) was an ancient Egyptian king, the sixth and penultimate ruler of the 6th Dynasty. He reigned for 1 year and 1 month in the second half of the 23rd century BC, at the very end of the Old Kingdom period. Nemtyemsaf II likely ascended the throne as an old man, succeeding his long-lived father Pepi II Neferkare at a time when the power of the king was crumbling.

== Attestations ==
Merenre Nemtyemsaf II is attested on the 4th line, column 6 of the Turin canon, a king list redacted in the early Ramesside Period. Although his name is lost in the canon, the duration of its reign is still readable as 1 year and 1 month, following the reign of Pepi II Neferkare.

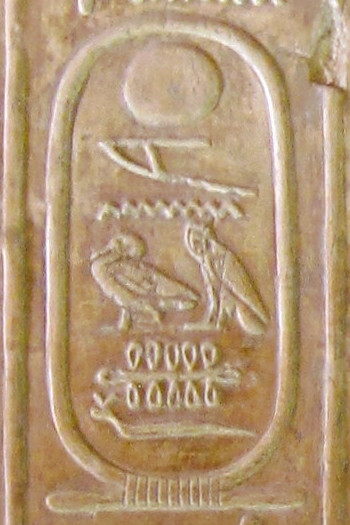
The cartouche of Merenre Nemtyemsaf II on the Abydos king list

Nemtyemsaf II is also attested on the 39th entry of the Abydos King List, which dates to the reign of Seti I and constitutes one of the best preserved historical records for the end of the Old Kingdom and beginning of the First Intermediate Period. The Abydos king list is the only document where Nemtyemsaf II bears the throne name Merenre.

A later historical source also records the existence of Nemtyemsaf II: indeed he is mentioned in Manetho's Aegyptiaca, a history of Egypt written in the 3rd century BC. Manetho gives Nemtyemsaf II's name as Menthesouphis and credits him with one year of reign.

There is only one contemporary artefact known for sure to belong to Nemtyemsaf II. It is a damaged false door inscribed with Sa-nesu semsu Nemtyemsaf, meaning "The elder king's son Nemtyemsaf", and was discovered near the site of the pyramid of Neith, Pepi II's half-sister and queen and most likely Nemtyemsaf II's mother. As indicated by the epithet of "elder king's son", this inscription was made before Nemtyemsaf's accession to the throne, when he was the heir apparent and also shows that he bore this name before becoming a king.

A second artefact may possibly belong to Nemtyemsaf II: a decree to protect the funerary cults of queens Ankhesenpepi I and Neith discovered in the mortuary temple of queen Neith. If this decree was indeed issued by Nemtyemsaf II, his Horus name would be S[...]tawy meaning, "He who causes the two lands to...".

== Reign ==
Nemtyemsaf II succeeded his father Pepi II after his extremely long reign, believed to have been around 64 years. Nothing is known for certain of Nemtyemsaf's activities but he likely had to face the collapse of the royal power and the rise of the provincial nomarchs. Less than 3 years after his death, the Old Kingdom period ended and the chaos of the First Intermediate Period started. Nemtyemsaf II may possibly have started a pyramid for himself and, if so, it would likely have been in Saqqara, close to that of his father.

== Herodotus story ==
In his Histories, the Greek historian Herodotus records a legend according to which an Egyptian queen Nitocris took revenge on the murder of her brother and husband by a rioting mob, allegedly Nemtyemsaf II, by drowning all his murderers during a banquet where she had gathered them. It is now suggested that the name "Nitocris" is a result of conflation and distortion from the name of a real male pharaoh, Neitiqerty Siptah, who succeeded Nemtyemsaf II.

== Notes ==
Preceded by Possibly Pepi II	King of Egypt c. 2214 – c. 2213 BC	Succeeded by Possibly Neitiqerty Siptah
