= Sixth Dynasty of Egypt =

Final Dynasty of the Old Kingdom of Egypt

- c. 2345 BC–c. 2181 BC
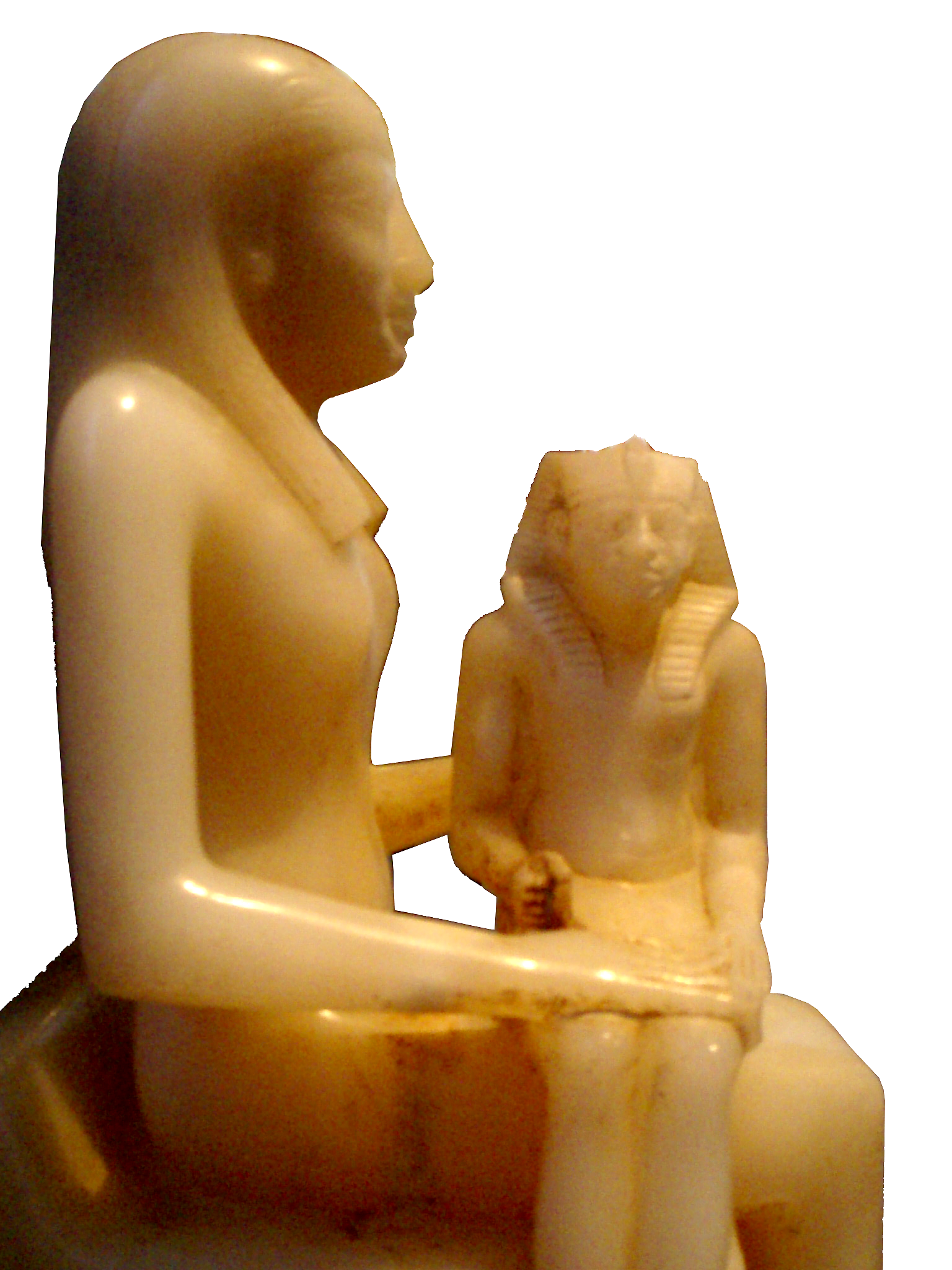
- Ankhnesmeryre II, the queen of Egypt, and her child (son) Pepi II Neferkare, the pharaoh of Egypt
- Capital: Memphis
- Common languages: Egyptian language
- Religion: ancient Egyptian religion
- Government: Absolute monarchy
- Historical era: Bronze Age
  - Established: c. 2345 BC
  - Disestablished: c. 2181 BC
Preceded by	Succeeded by
Fifth Dynasty of Egypt	Seventh Dynasty of Egypt; Eighth Dynasty of Egypt

The Sixth Dynasty of ancient Egypt (notated Dynasty VI), along with the Third, Fourth and Fifth Dynasty, constitutes the Old Kingdom of Dynastic Egypt.

== History ==
The Sixth Dynasty is considered by many authorities as the last dynasty of the Old Kingdom, although The Oxford History of Ancient Egypt includes Dynasties VII and VIII as part of the Old Kingdom. Manetho writes that these kings ruled from Memphis, since their pyramids were built at Saqqara, very close to Memphis.

By the Fifth Dynasty, the religious institution had established itself as the dominant force in society; a trend of growth in the bureaucracy and the priesthood, and a decline in the pharaoh's power had been established during Neferirkare Kakai's reign. During Djedkare Isesi's rule, officials were endowed with greater authority—evidenced by the opulent private tombs they constructed—eventually leading to the creation of a feudal system in effect. These established trends—decentralization of authority, coupled with growth in bureaucracy—intensified during the three decades of Unas's rule, which also witnessed economic decline. This continued into the Sixth Dynasty, leading into the First Intermediate Period.

== Pharaohs ==
Known pharaohs of the Sixth Dynasty are listed in the table below. Manetho accords the dynasty 203 regnal years from Teti to Nitocris, while the Turin Canon assigns 181 regnal years, but with three additional kings concluding with Aba—discounting the reigns of the added Eighth Dynasty kings, this is reduced to 155 regnal years. This estimate varies between both scholar and source. (Note: Proposed dates for the Sixth Dynasty: c. 2460–2200 BC, c. 2374–2200 BC, c. 2370–2190 BC, c. 2345–2181 BC, c. 2323–2150 BC, c. 2282–2117 BC.)

Dynasty VI pharaohs
Nomen (personal name)	Prenomen (throne name)	Horus-name	Image	Proposed dates	Estimated regnal duration	Pyramid	Queen(s)
Teti	Teti	Seheteptawy		2345–2333 BC	Manetho: 30–33 years Royal Turin Canon (RTC): < 7 months Cattle count: 6th = 12–13 years	Pyramid of Teti at Saqqara	Iput I Khuit; Khentkaus IV; Neith
Userkare	(unknown)	(unknown)		2333–2331 BC	Manetho: Unattested, possibly involved in Teti's murder RTC: Possibly lost in lacuna Cattle count: Unknown, lost in lacuna(?)		
Pepi I	Nefersahor (originally); Merenre (later)	Merytawy		2331–2287 BC	Manetho: 52 years RTC: 20 or 44 years Cattle count: 25th = 49–50 years	Pyramid of Pepi I in South Saqqara	Ankhesenpepi I Ankhesenpepi II; Nubwenet; Meritites IV; Inenek-Inti; Mehaa; Nedjeftet
Nemtyemsaf I	Merenre	Ankhkhau		2287–2278 BC	Manetho: 7 years RTC: 6 years Cattle count: 5th + 1 year = 10 years	Pyramid of Merenre in South Saqqara	Ankhesenpepi II
Pepi II	Neferkare	Netjerkhau		2278–2184 BC	Manetho: 94 years RTC: > 90 years Cattle count: 33rd = 64–66 years	Pyramid of Pepi II in South Saqqara	Neith; Iput II; Ankhesenpepi III; Ankhesenpepi IV; Udjebten
Nemtyemsaf II	Merenre [Nemty?]emsaf	(unknown)		2184 BC	Manetho: 1 year RTC: 1 year, 1 month		
Netjerkare or Nitocris	Siptah	(unknown)		2184–2181 BC	Manetho: Nitocris for 12 years RTC: Originally thought to identify Nitocris, a recent study of the papyrus has altered this assessment in favour of Netjerkare, who is also attested on the Abydos king list.		

=== Teti ===
Teti is identified as the first king of the Sixth Dynasty by Manetho, after the conclusion of the reign of Unas. He acceded to the throne in the 23rd century BC.

Teti is assigned a regnal duration of 30 or 33 years by Manetho—improbably long as the celebration of a Sed festival is not attested to, and the latest date recorded corresponds to the sixth cattle count, 12 or 13 years into his reign. The Royal Canon of Turin (RTC) gives another unlikely estimate of seven months. The archaeologist Hartwig Altenmüller mediates between Manetho and the record of the cattle count to offer a reign length of around 23 years. The Egyptologists Peter Clayton and William Smith accord 12 years to his reign. (Note: Proposed dates for Teti's reign: c. 2374–2354 BC, c. 2345–2333 BC, c. 2345–2323 BC, c. 2323–2191 BC, c. 2282–2270 BC.)

The relationship between Teti and his predecessors remains unclear, but his wife Iput is thought to be a daughter of Unas. This would mean that Teti ascended to the throne as Unas's son-in-law. His inauguration solved a potential succession crisis, Unas having died without a male heir. Teti adopted the Horus name Seheteptawy (meaning "He who pacifies the Two Lands") to establish his reign as one of renewed political unity. The transition appears to have occurred smoothly, and Teti retained officials from his predecessors of the Fifth Dynasty, such as viziers Mehu and Kagemni who had begun their careers under Djedkare Isesi. Despite this, the RTC too inserts a break between Unas and Teti, which the Egyptologist Jaromìr Malek contends relates to a "change of location of the capital and royal residence". The capital migrated from "White Wall" to the populous suburbs further south to "Djed-isut"—derived from the name of Teti's pyramid and pyramid town, and located east of the monument. The royal residence might have been yet further south, in the valley away and across a lake from the city, east of South Saqqara—where the pyramids of Djedkare Isesi and Pepi I were built.

Teti had his daughter, Sesheshet, married to one of his viziers and later chief priest, Mereruka, a clear sign of his interest in co-operating with the noble class. Mereruka was buried close to Teti's pyramid, in a lavish tomb in North Saqqara. As part of his policy of pacification, Teti issued a decree exempting the temple at Abydos from taxation. He was the first ruler to be closely associated with the cult of Hathor at Dendera. Abroad, Teti maintained trade relations with Byblos and Nubia.

Teti commissioned the construction of a pyramid at North Saqqara. His pyramid follows the standard set by Djedkare Isesi, with a base length of 78.5 m (258 ft; 150 cu) converging to the apex at ~53° attaining a peak height of 52.5 m (172 ft; 100 cu). The substructure of the pyramid was very similar to Unas's and Djedkare Isesi's; it had a descending corridor and horizontal passage guarded at about the middle by three granite portcullises, leading to an antechamber flanked to its east by the serdab with its three recesses and to its west by the burial chamber containing the sarcophagus. The walls of the chambers and a section of the horizontal passage were inscribed with Pyramid Texts, as in Unas' pyramid. The mortuary temple, with the exception of its entrance, conforms to the same basic plans as his predecessors. The complex contained a cult pyramid to the south-east of the pyramid with base length 15.7 m (52 ft; 30 cu). The causeway connecting to the mortuary temple is yet to be excavated, while the valley temple and pyramid town are entirely missing. Teti's pyramid became the site of a large necropolis, and included the pyramids of his wives Neith and Iput, mother of Pepi I. Iput's skeleton was discovered buried in her pyramid in a wooden coffin.

Manetho claims that Teti was assassinated by a bodyguard, but no contemporary sources confirm this. The story, if true, might explain the references to the ephemeral ruler Userkare, proposed to have briefly reigned between Teti and Pepi I. Userkare is attested to in the Royal Turin Canon and Abydos king-list, and is mentioned in several contemporaneous documents.

=== Pepi I ===
During this dynasty, expeditions were sent to Wadi Maghara in the Sinai Peninsula to mine for turquoise and copper, as well as to the mines at Hatnub and Wadi Hammamat. The pharaoh Djedkara sent trade expeditions south to Punt and north to Byblos, and Pepi I sent expeditions not only to these locations, but also as far as Ebla in modern-day Syria.

=== Pepi II ===
The most notable member of this dynasty was Pepi II, who is credited with a reign of 94 years.

=== Neitiqerty ===
Also known by the Greek name Nitocris, this woman is believed by some authorities to have been not only the first female pharaoh but the first queen in the world, although it is currently accepted that her name is actually a mistranslation of the king Neitiqerty Siptah.

== Family tree ==
Sesheshet	Unas
Fifth Dynasty
Khuit II	Teti	Iput I
Userkare	Tetiankhkem
Ankhesenpepi I	Pepi I Meryre	Ankhesenpepi II	Nubwenet	Inenek-Inti
Merenre Nemtyemsaf I
Ankhesenpepi III	Iput II	Pepi II Neferkare (Note: Alternatively Pepi II may be the son of Pepi I and Ankhesenpepi II)	Neith	Ankhesenpepi IV	Udjebten	Meritites IV
Merenre Nemtyemsaf II

== The rise of the nobility ==
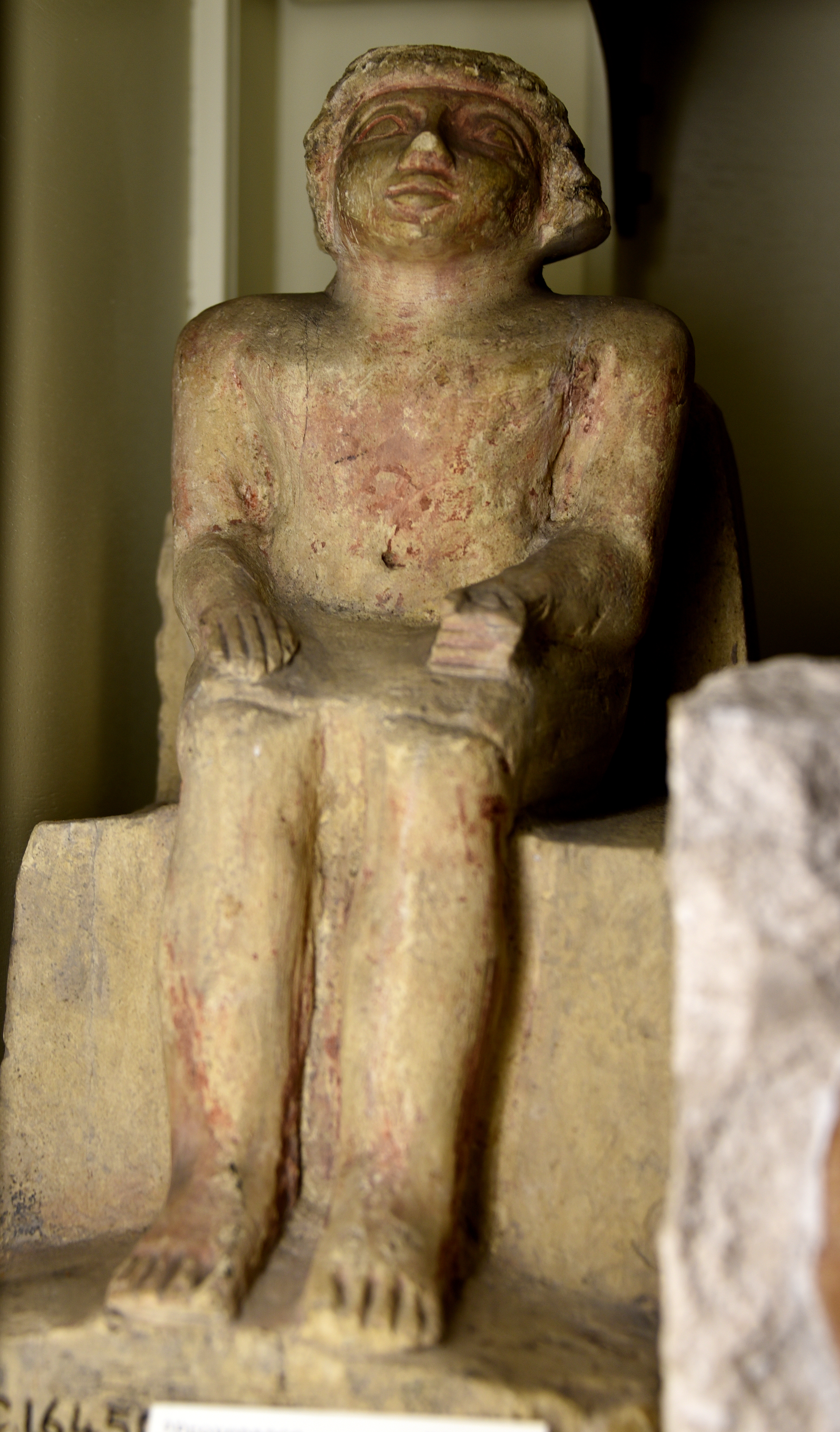
Seated statue of an official on block chair. Limestone. 6th Dynasty. From Egypt. The Petrie Museum of Egyptian Archaeology, London

With the growing number of biographical inscriptions in non-royal tombs, our academic knowledge of the contemporary history in Egyptian broadened. There is modern confirmation of records describing an unsuccessful plot against Pepi I, and of a letter written by the young king Pepi II, which expressed excitement that one of his expeditions would return with a dancing pygmy from the land of Yam, located south of Nubia.

These non-royal tomb inscriptions are one example of the growing power of the nobility, which further weakened the king’s absolute rule. As a result, it is believed that after the death of the long-lived Pepi II, his vassals were sufficiently entrenched to resist the authority of his many successors. This may have contributed to the rapid decline of the Old Kingdom.

== Comparison of regnal lists ==
The ancient king lists are in broad agreement on the order of monarchs in this dynasty, though Userkare was sometimes omitted. The Saqqara Tablet additionally omits all kings who reigned after Pepi II and before the Middle Kingdom of Egypt. The Karnak King List is very selective. The Turin King List is in a fragmentary state and most names of kings for this dynasty are now lost.

Historical pharaoh	Abydos King List	Karnak King List	Saqqara Tablet	Turin King List	Manetho	Reign years	
Historical pharaoh	Abydos King List	Karnak King List	Saqqara Tablet	Turin King List	Manetho	Turin List	Manetho
Teti	Teti	Teti	Teti	Name lost	Othoes	Unknown years, 6 months and 21 days	30
Userkare	Userkare	–	–	Name lost	–	Lost	–
Pepi I Meryre	Meryre	Pepi	Pepi	Name lost	Phios	20 years	53
Merenre Nemtyemsaf I	Merenre	Merenre	Merenre	Name lost	Methusouphis	44 years	7
Pepi II Neferkare	Neferkare	–	Neferkare	Name lost	Phiops	90+ years	94
Merenre Nemtyemsaf II	Merenre Saemsaf	–	–	Name lost	Menthesouphis	1 year and 1 month	1
Netjerkare Siptah	Netjerikare	–	–	Netiqerty Siptah	Nitokris	Lost	12

== Sources ==
- Allen, James; Allen, Susan; Anderson, Julie; et al. (1999). Egyptian Art in the Age of the Pyramids. New York: The Metropolitan Museum of Art. ISBN 978-0-8109-6543-0. OCLC 41431623.
- Altenmüller, Hartwig (2001). "Old Kingdom: Sixth Dynasty". In Redford, Donald B. (ed.). The Oxford Encyclopedia of Ancient Egypt, Volume 2. Oxford: Oxford University Press. pp. 601–605. ISBN 978-0-19-510234-5.
- Baker, Darrel D. (2008). The Encyclopedia of the Pharaohs: Volume I - Predynastic to the Twentieth Dynasty 3300–1069 BC. London: Stacey International. ISBN 978-1-905299-37-9.
- Bard, Kathryn, ed. (1999). Encyclopedia of the Archaeology of Ancient Egypt. London; New York: Routledge. ISBN 978-0-203-98283-9.
- Baud, Michel; Dobrev, Vassil (1995). "De nouvelles annales de l'Ancien Empire égyptien. Une "Pierre de Palerme" pour la VIe dynastie". Bulletin de l'Institut Français d'Archéologie Orientale (in French). 95: 23–92. ISSN 0255-0962.
- Clayton, Peter A. (1994). Chronicle of the Pharaohs. London: Thames & Hudson. ISBN 978-0-500-05074-3.
- Dodson, Aidan; Hilton, Dyan (2004). The Complete Royal Families of Ancient Egypt. London: Thames & Hudson. ISBN 978-0-500-05128-3.
- Grimal, Nicolas (1992). A History of Ancient Egypt. Translated by Ian Shaw. Oxford: Blackwell publishing. ISBN 978-0-631-19396-8.
- Kanawati, Naguib (2003). Conspiracies in the Egyptian Palace: Unis to Pepy I. London: Routledge. ISBN 0-203-16673-6.
- Leclant, Jean (1999). "A Brief History of the Old Kingdom". Egyptian Art in the Age of the Pyramids. New York: The Metropolitan Museum of Art. pp. 3–12. ISBN 978-0-8109-6543-0. OCLC 41431623.
- Lehner, Mark (2008). The Complete Pyramids. New York: Thames & Hudson. ISBN 978-0-500-28547-3.
- Leprohon, Ronald J. (2013). The Great Name: Ancient Egyptian Royal Titulary. Vol. 33 of Writings from the ancient world. Atlanta: Society of Biblical Literature. ISBN 978-1-589-83736-2.
- Malek, Jaromir (2003). "The Old Kingdom (c. 2686–2160 BC)". In Shaw, Ian (ed.). The Oxford History of Ancient Egypt. Oxford University Press. pp. 83–107. ISBN 978-0-19-815034-3.
- Manetho; Waddell, William Gillan (1964). Aegyptiaca. The Loeb classical library, 350. Cambridge: Harvard University Press. OCLC 1067847872.
- Ryholt, Kim (1997). The Political Situation in Egypt during the Second Intermediate Period c. 1800–1550 B.C. CNI publications. Vol. 20. Copenhagen: The Carsten Niebuhr Institute of Near Eastern Studies: Museum Tusculam Press. ISBN 87-7289-421-0.
- Shaw, Ian, ed. (2003). The Oxford History of Ancient Egypt. Oxford: Oxford University Press. ISBN 978-0-19-815034-3.
- Smith, William Stevenson (1962). "XIV: The Old Kingdom in Egypt and the Beginning of the First Intermediate Period". The Cambridge Ancient History. Vol. 1. Cambridge: Cambridge University Press. pp. 1–72. OCLC 879104162.
- Theis, Christoffer (2010). Kahl, Jochem; Kloth, Nicole (eds.). "Die Pyramiden der Ersten Zwischenzeit, Nach philologischen und archäologischen Quellen". Studien zur Altägyptischen Kultur (in German). Band 39. Hamburg: Helmut Buske Verlag: 321–339. ISBN 978-3-87548-584-4. ISSN 0340-2215.
- Verner, Miroslav (2001b). "Old Kingdom". In Redford, Donald B. (ed.). The Oxford Encyclopedia of Ancient Egypt, Volume 2. Oxford: Oxford University Press. pp. 585–591. ISBN 978-0-19-510234-5.
- Verner, Miroslav (2001d). The Pyramids: The Mystery, Culture and Science of Egypt's Great Monuments. New York: Grove Press. ISBN 978-0-8021-1703-8.

Preceded by Fifth Dynasty	Dynasty of Egypt c. 2345 – 2181 BC	Succeeded by (Seventh); Eighth Dynasty
