= Gustave Jéquier =

Swiss archeologist and Egyptologist (1868–1946)

- Born: 14 August 1868; Neuchâtel
- Died: 24 March 1946 (aged 77); Neuchâtel
- Occupations: archeologist and egyptologist

Gustave Jéquier (14 August 1868, Neuchâtel, Switzerland – 24 March 1946, Neuchâtel) was an Egyptologist and one of the first archaeologists to excavate ancient Persian cities in what is now Iran. He was a member of Jacques de Morgan's 1901 Susa expedition, which led to the discovery of the famous Code of Hammurabi, now on display in the Louvre.

Jéquier began his career under the guidance of the Egyptologists Gaston Maspero and Jacques de Morgan, and specialized in the Predynastic Period. He participated in major excavations sponsored by the Supreme Council of Antiquities.

Jéquier excavated sites at Saqqara, such as the pyramid of Ibi and the pyramid of Khendjer, at Dahshur, Lisht, and Mazghuna.

Jéquier's work on the Pyramid Texts was a significant step forward in the understanding of these religious works.

== Publications ==
- (avec J.E. Gautier) Mémoire sur les fouilles de Licht, 1902
- Avec Georges Legrain et Urbain Bouriant, Monuments pour servir à l'étude du culte d'Atonou en Égypte I, 1903
- Décoration égyptienne, plafonds et frises végétales du Nouvel Empire thébain (1400-1000 av. J.-C.), 1911
- Histoire de la civilisation égyptienne des origines à la conquête d'Alexandre, 1913; réédition 1923
- Les Temples memphites et thébains des origines à la XVIIIe dynastie, 1920
- Les Temples ramessides et saïtes de la XIXe à la XXXe dynastie, 1922
- Le mastabat Faraoun : douze ans de fouilles à Saqqarah, 1928
- La Pyramide d'Oudjebten, 1928
- Deux pyramides du moyen empire, 1932
- Les pyramides des reines Neit et Apouit, Fouilles à Saqqarah, 1933
- La pyramide d'Aba, 1935
- Rapport préliminaire sur les travaux exécutés en 1935-1936 dans la partie méridionale de la nécropole memphite, ASAE, 1936
- Le monument funéraire de Pépi II, volume I. : Le tombeau royal, 1936; volume II. : Le temple, 1938; volume III. : Les approches du temple, 1940 - IFAO
- Douze ans de fouilles dans la nécropole memphite, 1924-1936, Université de Neuchâtel, 1940
- (avec Léon et Michel Jéquier) Armorial neuchâtelois. Avec la collaboration de Gustave Jéquier, Neuchâtel, La Baconnière, 1941–1944
- Considérations sur les religions égyptiennes, Neuchâtel, La Baconnière, 1946
