= Badrashin =

Badrashin البدرشين
- Town
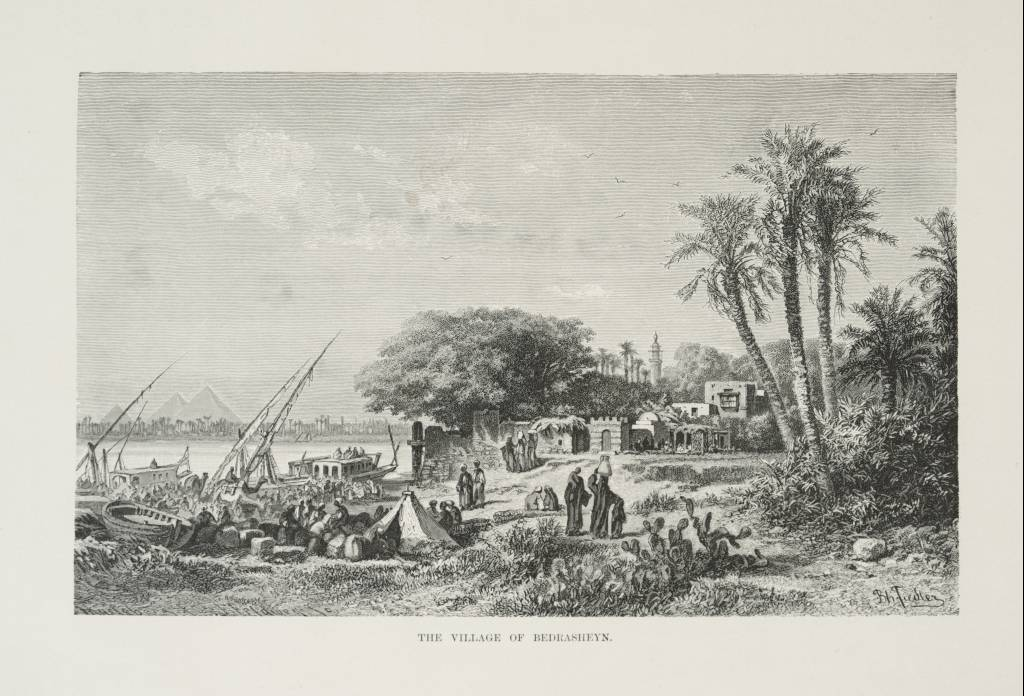
- 1878 illustration of Badrshin

- Location in Egypt
- Coordinates: 29.852°N 31.276°E
- Country: Egypt
- Governorate: Giza
- Founded: c. 3000 BCE

Area
  - Total: 13.3 km^{2} (5.1 sq mi)
- Elevation: 24 m (79 ft)

Population (2023)
  - Total: 92,724
  - Density: 6,970/km^{2} (18,100/sq mi)
- Time zone: UTC+2 (EET)
  - Summer (DST): UTC+3 (EEST)
- Postal code: 12918

Badrashin (Arabic: البدرشين) is a city, and capital of the eponymous markaz, in Giza Governorate, Egypt.

Badrashin County is the site of Ancient Egypt's royal capital, Men-nefer (Memphis). While much of the actual city is now buried under modern villages, its royal tombs and pyramids, the Memphite Necropolis, is listed as a UNESCO world heritage site.

== Pyramids ==
The city is home to the oldest Egyptian monuments. In the village of Abusir, the oldest-known pyramids can be found. These pyramids are of the sun temples. The village of Saqqara hosts the first stone building in history, the pyramid of King Djoser and amphitheatre.

The pyramids of Dahshur, such as the pyramid of Snefru, are the first complete pyramids known to history. The pyramid of Amenemhat II, pyramid of Amenemhat III, and many temples, such as the Temple of King Ramesses II, in which his statue was discovered, were transferred to Bab Al-Hadid Square. Ramesses is in the heart of Cairo and was then moved to the shooting range at the entrance to the pyramids. The village of Aziziyah is allegedly the prison where Joseph was incarcerated. The city has the oldest bridge in Egypt, El Maraziq bridge.

== Geography ==
Badrashin is 30 km southwest of Cairo on the west bank of the Nile River.

== Economy ==
The city is surrounded by villages and irrigated land. It produces a third of Egypt's dates.

Badrashin is the second largest producer of furniture in Egypt after Damietta. Other industries include: oil, soap-making, rug-making, textiles, yacht-building and furniture-making.
