= Nedjeftet =

M1 f R12 t t
Nḏf tt

Queen consort of Egypt
- Tenure: c. 2310 BC

Nedjeftet (fl. c. 2310 BC) is a queen mentioned on reliefs discovered near the pyramid complex of Pepi I (close to the pyramid complex of Queen Inenek-Inti). She may have been a wife of Pepi. Her name was also that of the 20th nome, later known as the Herakleopolis nome, in Upper Egypt; it is possible her family came from there and the marriage was to strengthen a king's position as opposed to the local lords.

== Titles ==
Her titles were: Great one of the hetes-sceptre (wrt-ḥts), She who sees Horus and Seth (m33t-hrw-stsh), Great of Praises (wrt-ḥzwt), King's Wife (ḥmt-niswt), King's Wife, his beloved (ḥmt-niswt meryt.f), and Attendant of Horus (ḫt-ḥrw).
