= Pepi I Meryre =

Egyptian pharaoh, third ruler of the Sixth Dynasty of Egypt in the late 24th century BC

- Pepy; Phios; Phius; φιός
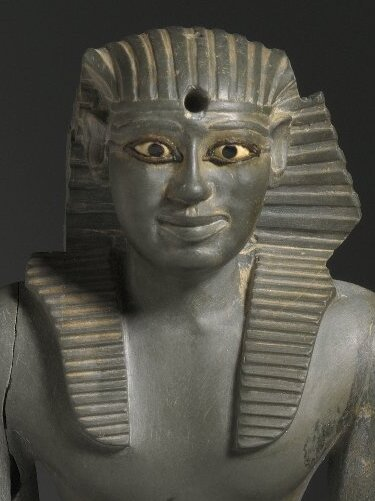
- Kneeling statuette of Pepi I, Brooklyn Museum (Note: Catalog number 39.121.)

Pharaoh
- Reign: Duration: over 40 years, in the second half of the 24th century BC or early 23rd century BC (Note: Dates proposed for Pepi I's reign: 2390–2361 BC, 2354–2310 BC, 2338–2298 BC, 2335–2285 BC, 2332–2283 BC, 2321–2287 BC, 2289–2255 BC, 2285–2235 BC, 2276–2228 BC.)
- Coregency: uncertain, possibly with his son Merenre at the end of his reign
- Predecessor: Userkare
- Successor: Merenre Nemtyemsaf I
Royal titulary
Horus name
Mery Tawy
mry tꜣwj
Horus, Beloved of the Two Lands
G5	mr i i tA tA
Nebty name
Mery Khet Nebti
mry ẖt nbtj
Beloved of the Two Ladies' body
G16	mr i i X t Z1
Golden Horus
Biku Nebu
bjkw nbw
The triple falcons are golden
G7 G7 G7 nbw
Prenomen
- Nefer za hor
  nfr zꜣ ḥr
  Perfect is the protection of Horus
  Excellent is the protection of Horus
  M23 t L2 t < G5 F35 V18 >
- Meryre
  mry rꜥ
  Beloved of ReM23 t L2 t < N5 U6 M17 M17 >
Nomen
Pepi
ppy

G39 N5	Q3 Q3 M17 M17
- Consorts: Ankhesenpepi I; Ankhesenpepi II; Nubwenet; Inenek-Inti; Mehaa; Sebwetet; uncertain: Nedjeftet; Behenu; One consort responsible for a conspiracy against Pepi known only through her title "Weret-Yamtes"
- Children: Merenre Nemtyemsaf I (m); probably: Hornetjerkhet (m); Tetiankh (m); Meritites IV (f); Neith (f); Iput II (f); uncertain: Pepi II (m)
- Father: Teti
- Mother: Iput
- Burial: Pyramid of Pepi I in South Saqqara
- Monuments: Pyramid complex Pepi Men-nefer, at least six pyramids for his consorts and numerous Ka-chapels
- Dynasty: 6th Dynasty

Pepi I Meryre (also Pepy I) was an ancient Egyptian pharaoh, third king of the Sixth Dynasty of Egypt, who ruled for over 40 years at the turn of the 24th and 23rd centuries BC, toward the end of the Old Kingdom period. He was the son of Teti, the founder of the dynasty, and ascended the throne only after the brief intervening reign of the enigmatic pharaoh Userkare. His mother was Iput, who may have been a daughter of Unas, the final ruler of the preceding Fifth Dynasty. Pepi I, who had at least six consorts, was succeeded by his son Merenre Nemtyemsaf I, with whom he may have shared power in a coregency at the very end of his reign. Pepi II Neferkare, who might also have been Pepi I's son, succeeded Merenre.

Several difficulties accumulated during Pepi's reign, beginning with the possible murder of his father and the ensuing reign of Userkare. Later, probably after his twentieth year of reign, Pepi faced a harem conspiracy hatched by one of his consorts who may have tried to have her son designated heir to the throne, and possibly another conspiracy involving his vizier at the end of his reign. Confronted with the protracted decline of pharaonic power and the emergence of dynasties of local officials, Pepi reacted with a vast architectural program involving the construction of temples dedicated to local gods and numerous chapels for his own cult throughout Egypt, reinforcing his presence in the provinces. Egypt's prosperity allowed Pepi to become the most prolific builder of the Old Kingdom. At the same time, Pepi favored the rise of small provincial centres and recruited officials of non-noble extraction to curtail the influence of powerful local families. Continuing Teti's policy, Pepi expanded a network of warehouses accessible to royal envoys and from which taxes and labor could easily be collected. Finally, he buttressed his power after the harem conspiracy by forming alliances with Khui, the provincial nomarch of Abydos, marrying two of his daughters, Ankhesenpepi I and Ankhesenpepi II, and making both Khui's wife Nebet and her son Djau viziers. The Egyptian state's external policy under Pepi comprised military campaigns against Nubia, Sinai and the southern Levant, landing troops on the Levantine coast using Egyptian transport boats. Trade with Byblos, Ebla and the oases of the Western Desert flourished, while Pepi launched mining and quarrying expeditions to Sinai and further afield.

Pepi had a pyramid complex built for his funerary cult in Saqqara, next to which he built at least a further six pyramids for his consorts. Pepi's pyramid, which originally stood 52.5 m (172 ft) tall, and an accompanying high temple, followed the standard layout inherited from the late Fifth Dynasty. The most extensive corpus of Pyramid Texts from the Old Kingdom cover the walls of Pepi I's burial chamber, antechamber and much of the corridor leading to it. For the first time, these texts also appear in some of the consorts' pyramids. Excavations revealed a bundle of viscera and a mummy fragment, both presumed to belong to the pharaoh. Pepi's complex, called Pepi Mennefer, remained the focus of his funerary cult well into the Middle Kingdom and ultimately gave its name to the nearby capital of Egypt, Memphis. Pepi's cult stopped early in the Second Intermediate Period. Pepi's monuments began to be quarried for their stone in the New Kingdom, and in the Mamluk era they were almost entirely dismantled.

== Family ==
=== Parents ===
Pepi was the son of the pharaoh Teti and Iput. Her parentage is directly attested to by a relief on a decree uncovered in Coptos that mentions Iput as Pepi's mother, by inscriptions in her mortuary temple mentioning her titles as mother of a king and as mother of Pepi, (Note: Among her titles, Iput bore the titles of king's mother (mwt-niswt), mother of the king of Upper and Lower Egypt (mwt-niswt-biti) and king's mother of the pyramid Mennefer-Pepy (mwt-niswt-mn-nfr-ppy).) by the architecture of her tomb which had been changed from an original mastaba form into a pyramid on the accession of her son to the throne, and by her mention as being Pepi's mother on the Sixth Dynasty royal annals. Iput may have been a daughter of Unas, the last pharaoh of the Fifth Dynasty, although this remains uncertain and debated. She seems to have died before Pepi's accession to the throne. The observation that Teti was most probably Pepi's father follows from the location of Iput's tomb, next to Teti's pyramid as was customary for a queen consort.

=== Consorts ===
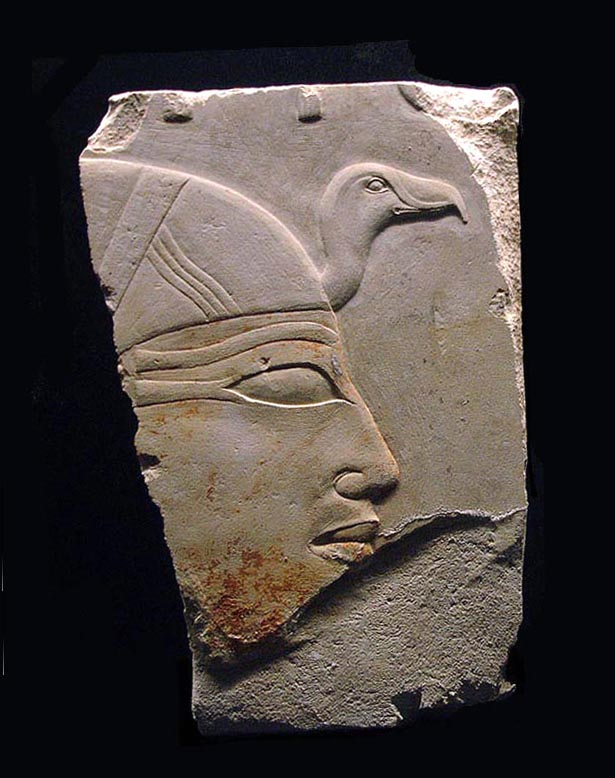
Ankhesenpepi II shown on a relief from her mortuary temple, Imhotep Museum

Egyptologists have identified six consorts of Pepi I with near certainty. Pepi's best-attested consorts were Ankhesenpepi I and Ankhesenpepi II, (Note: Their names are also rendered as Ankhnespepy I and II. In addition, the Ancient Egyptians also used the variants Ankhesenmeryre I and II.) who both bore future pharaohs and were daughters of the nomarch of Abydos Khui and his wife Nebet. Further consorts are Nubwenet, Inenek-Inti, who became one of Pepi's viziers, and Mehaa (also called Haaheru). All were buried in pyramids adjacent to that of Pepi. Relief fragments from the necropolis surrounding Pepi's pyramid mention another consort, Sebwetet.

Two more consorts have been proposed for Pepi I based on partial evidence. The first is Nedjeftet, whose name is recorded on blocks excavated in the necropolis adjacent to Pepi's pyramid. The identification of Nedjeftet as Pepi's consort remains uncertain owing to the lack of inscriptions explicitly naming her husband. Given the location of Nedjeftet's blocks in the necropolis, she may be the owner of a pyramid west of Pepi's. The second is another consort, named Behenu, who was buried in the second largest queen pyramid of Pepi's necropolis, north of his. She could either be one of his consorts or a consort of Pepi II.

A final unnamed consort, only referred to by her title "Weret-Yamtes" meaning "great of affection", is known from inscriptions uncovered in the tomb of Weni, an official serving Pepi. This consort, whose name is purposefully left unmentioned by Weni, conspired against Pepi and was prosecuted when the conspiracy was discovered.

=== Children ===
Pepi fathered at least four sons. Ankhesenpepi I probably bore him the future pharaoh Merenre Nemtyemsaf I. (Note: In an alternative hypothesis, Hans Goedicke has proposed that Merenre's mother was the consort known only from her title "Weret-Yamtes", responsible for the harem conspiracy against Pepi I. In this widely rejected hypothesis, Ankhesenpepi I was falsely claimed by the Ancient Egyptians to be Merenre's mother to safeguard his claim to the throne.) Ankhesenpepi II was the mother of Pepi II Neferkare, who was probably born at the very end of Pepi I's reign given he was only six upon ascending the throne after Merenre's rule. While a majority of Egyptologists favor this hypothesis, an alternative one holds that Pepi II could be a son of Merenre. Another of Pepi I's sons was Teti-ankh, meaning "Teti lives", whose mother has yet to be identified. Teti-ankh is known only from an ink inscription bearing his name discovered in Pepi's pyramid. Buried nearby is Prince Hornetjerkhet, a son of Pepi with Mehaa.

At least three of Pepi I's daughters have been tentatively identified, all future consorts of Pepi II. The first, Meritites IV, (Note: Meritites has also been proposed to be one of Pepi I's consorts rather than daughter, or an Eighth Dynasty queen buried here to indicate her filiation to Pepi I. Both views were proved wrong following excavations in Saqqara indicating she was Pepi's daughter.) was the king's eldest daughter and was buried in the necropolis surrounding her father's pyramid. The second is Neith, (Note: Vivienne Callendar proposed her as Pepi's eldest daughter, but excavations have now established that Meritites was the king's eldest daughter.) whom he fathered with Ankhesenpepi I. She may have been the mother of Pepi II's successor Merenre Nemtyemsaf II. The third is Iput II, whose identity as Pepi's daughter remains uncertain because her title of "daughter of the king" may only be honorary.

== Chronology ==
=== Relative chronology ===
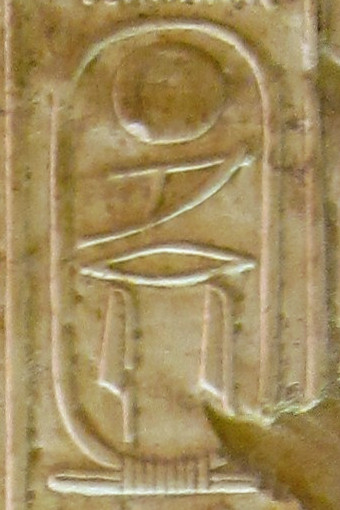
Pepi I's cartouche reading "Meryre" on the Abydos King List

The relative chronology of Pepi I's reign is well established by historical records, contemporary artifacts and archeological evidence, which agree he succeeded Userkare and was succeeded by Merenre I Nemtyemsaf. For example, the near-contemporary South Saqqara Stone, a royal annal inscribed during the reign of Pepi II, gives the succession "Teti → Userkare → Pepi I → Merenre I", making Pepi the third king of the Sixth Dynasty. Two more historical sources agree with this chronology: the Abydos king list, written under Seti I which places Pepi I's cartouche as the 36th entry between those of Userkare and Merenre, and the Turin canon, a list of kings on papyrus dating to the reign of Ramses II which records Pepi I in the fourth column, third row.

Historical sources against this order of succession include the Aegyptiaca (Αἰγυπτιακά), a history of Egypt written in the 3rd century BC during the reign of Ptolemy II (283 – 246 BC) by Manetho. No copies of the Aegyptiaca have survived, and it is now known only through later writings by Sextus Julius Africanus and Eusebius. According to the Byzantine scholar George Syncellus, Africanus wrote that the Aegyptiaca mentioned the succession "Othoês → Phius → Methusuphis" at the start of the Sixth Dynasty. Othoês, Phius (in Greek, φιός), and Methusuphis are understood to be the Hellenized forms for Teti, Pepi I and Merenre, respectively, (Note: In the case of Pepi I, the evolution of the name from Ancient Egyptian to Ancient Greek is understood to be as follows: "Pjpj ~ *Păyắpăyă > *Păyắpyă > *Pyŏ́ pyĕ > *Pyŏ́ p ~ Φίος".) meaning that the Aegyptiaca omits Userkare. Manetho's reconstruction of the early Sixth Dynasty agrees with the Karnak king list written under Thutmosis III. This list places Pepi's birth name immediately after that of Teti in the seventh entry of the second row. Unlike other sources such as the Turin canon, the purpose of the Karnak king list was not to be exhaustive, but rather to list a selection of royal ancestors to be honoured. Similarly the Saqqara Tablet, written under Ramses II, omits Userkare, with Pepi's name given as the 25th entry after that of Teti.

=== Length of reign ===
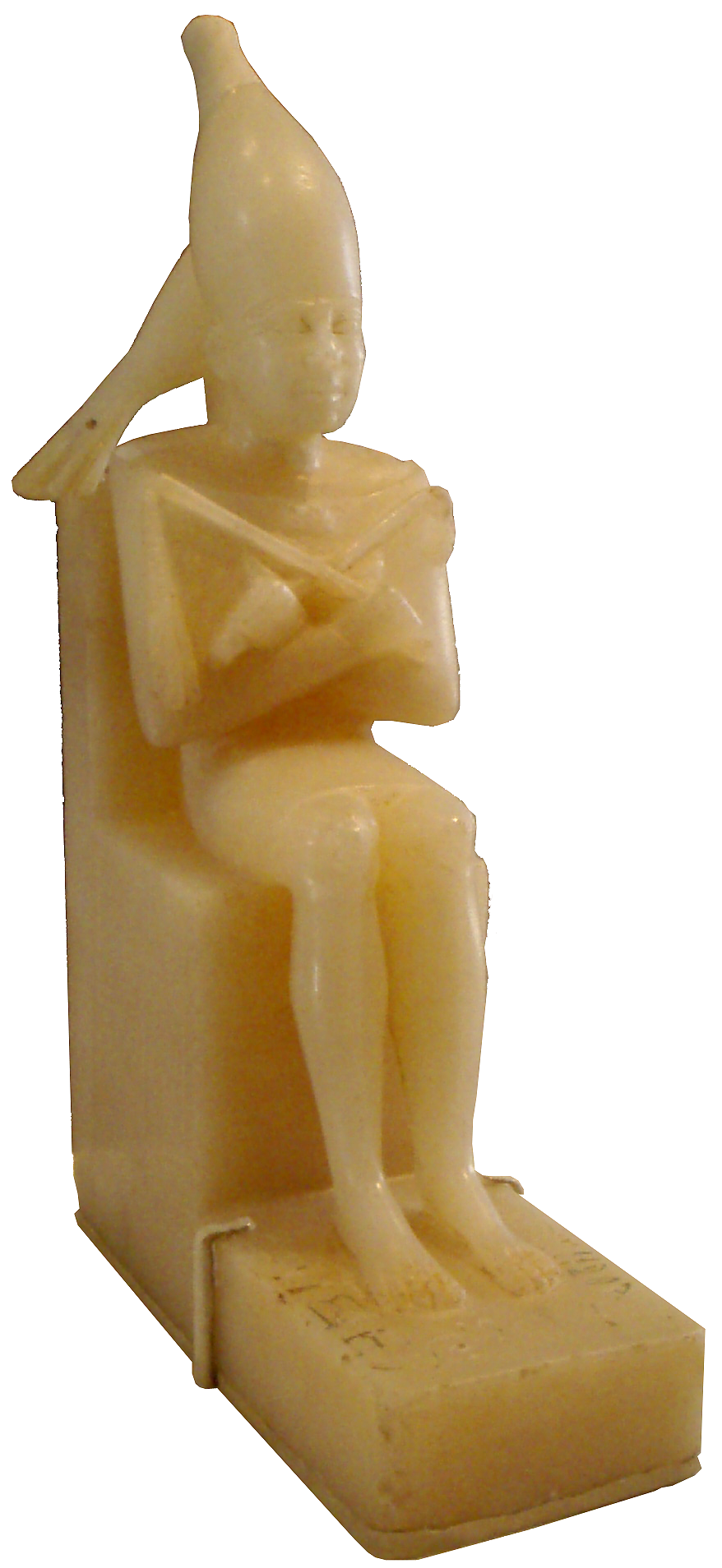
Alabaster statuette of Pepi I dressed for the Sed Festival, Brooklyn Museum

The length of Pepi I's reign remains somewhat uncertain, although as of 2021, the consensus is that he ruled over Egypt for over 40 years, possibly 49 or 50 years and possibly longer.

During the Old Kingdom period, the Egyptians counted years from the beginning of the reign of the current king. These years were referred to by the number of cattle counts which had taken place since the reign's start. The cattle count was an important event aimed at evaluating the amount of taxes to be levied on the population. This involved counting cattle, oxen and small livestock. During the early Sixth Dynasty, this count was probably biennial, (Note: There has been some doubt whether the cattle count dating system was strictly biennial or slightly more irregular early in the Sixth Dynasty. That the latter situation appeared to be the case was suggested by the "Year after the 18th Count, 3rd Month of Shemu day 27" inscription from Wadi Hammamat No. 74–75 which mentions the "first occurrence of the Heb Sed" in that year for Pepi. Normally, the Sed festival is first celebrated in a king's 30th year of reign while the 18th cattle count would have taken place in his 36th year, had it been strictly biennial. The Egyptologist Michel Baud points to a similar inscription dated to "Year after the 18th Count, 4th Month of Shemu day 5" in Sinai graffito No. 106. This could imply that the cattle count during the Sixth Dynasty was not regularly biennial, or that it was referenced continuously in the years following it. Michel Baud stresses that the year of the 18th count is preserved in the South Saqqara Stone and writes that: Between the mention of count 18 [here] and the next memorial formula which belongs to count 19, end of register D, the available space for count 18+ is the expected half of the average size of a theoretical [year count] compartment. It is hard to believe that such a narrow space corresponds to the jubilee celebration, which obviously had a considerable importance for this (and every) king. Therefore, the references to Pepi I's first jubilee being celebrated in his 18th cattle count are probably just part of this royal tendency to emphasize the king's first jubilee years after it was first celebrated and Baud notes that the longest year compartment in the South Saqqara Stone appears "at the beginning of register D. Fortuitously or not, this [year] compartment corresponds perfectly to year 30/31, if a strictly biennial system of numbering is presumed" for Pepi I's reign. (i.e. his 15th count) Therefore, the count was most probably biennial during Pepi I's reign and the reference to his final year—the 25 count—implies that he reigned for 49 full years.) occurring every two years.

The South Saqqara Stone and an inscription in Hatnub both record the 25th cattle count under Pepi I, his highest known date. Accepting a biennial count, this indicates that Pepi reigned for 49 years. That a 50th year of reign could have also been recorded on the royal annal cannot be discounted, however, because of the damaged state of the South Saqqara Stone. Another historical source supporting such a long reign is Africanus' epitome of Manetho's Aegyptiaca, which credits Pepi I with a reign of 53 years. (Note: The Turin King List gives only 20 years on the throne to Pepi I while his successor Merenre I is said to have reigned 44 years. This latter figure contradicts both contemporaneous and archaeological evidence. For example, the royal annals mention no further cattle count under Merenre I beyond his fifth, which might correspond to his tenth year of rule. The Egyptologist Kim Ryholt suggests that the two entries of the Turin king list might have been interchanged.)

Archaeological evidence in favor of a long reign for Pepi I includes his numerous building projects and many surviving objects made in celebration of his first Sed festival, which was meant to rejuvenate the king and was first celebrated on the 30th year of a king's rule. For example, numerous alabaster ointment vessels celebrating Pepi's first Sed festival have been discovered. They bear a standard inscriptions reading, "The king of Upper and Lower Egypt Meryre, may he be given life for ever. The first occasion of the Sed festival." Examples can now be found in museums throughout the world:

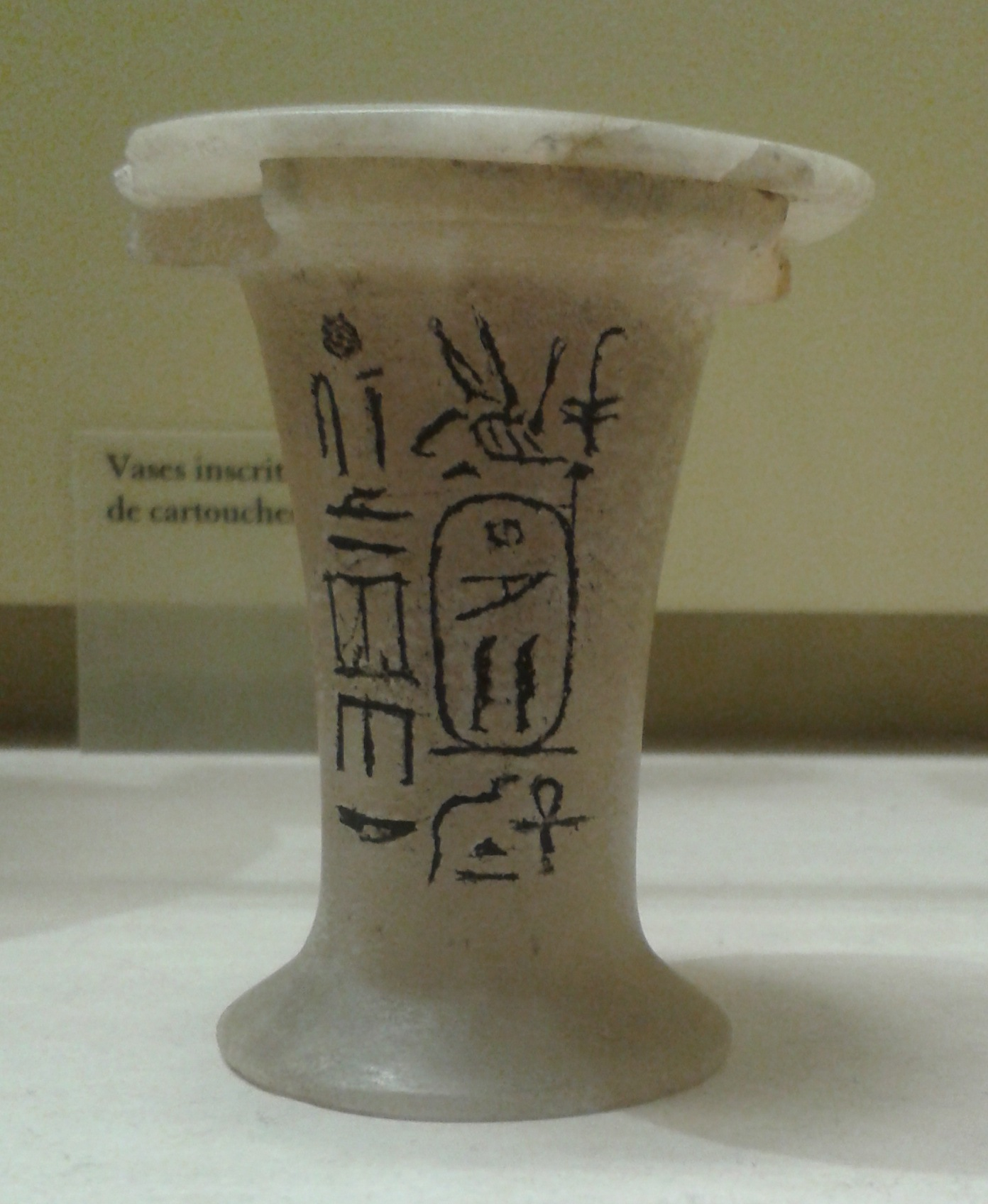
Musée du Louvre

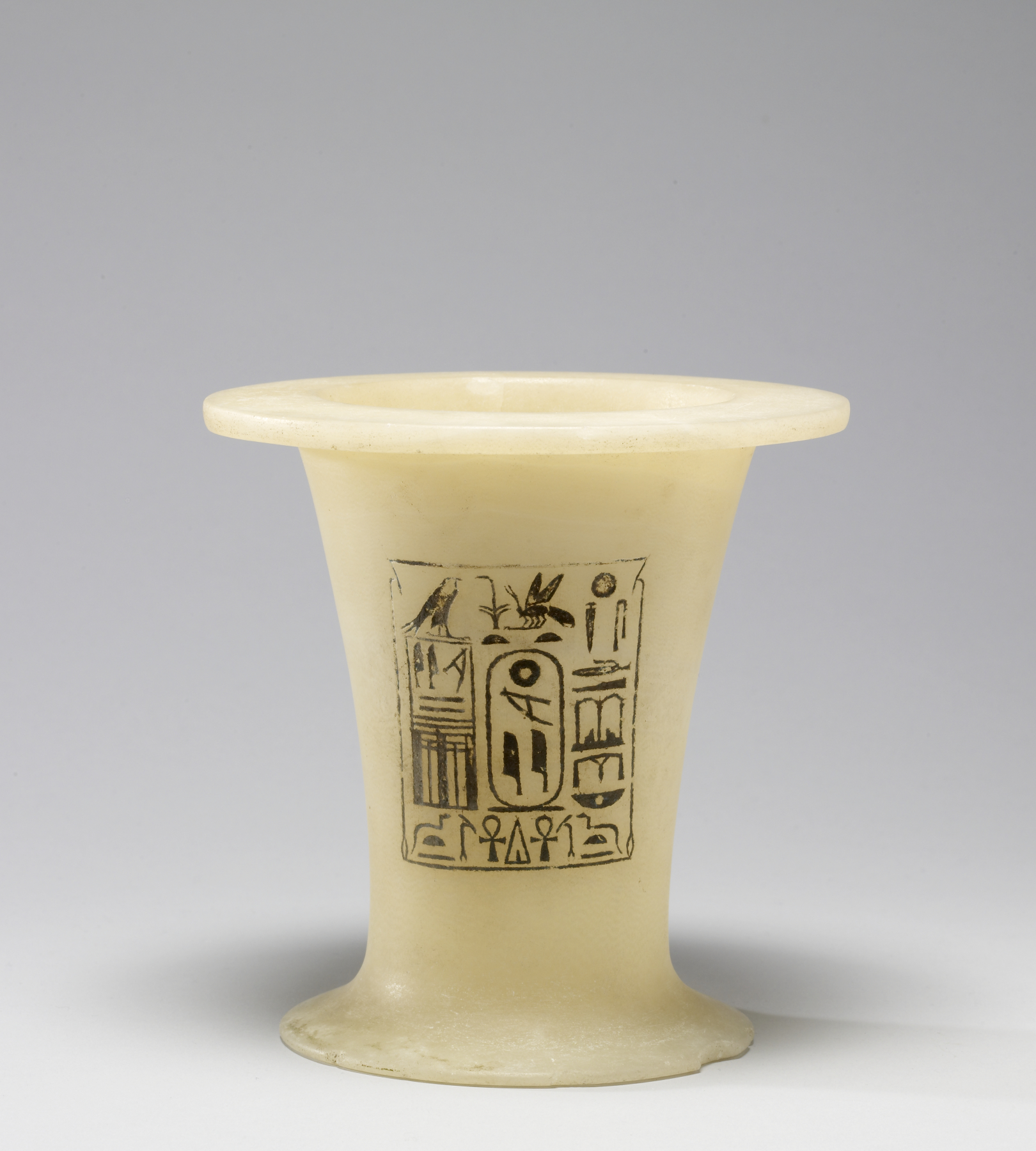
Walters Art Museum

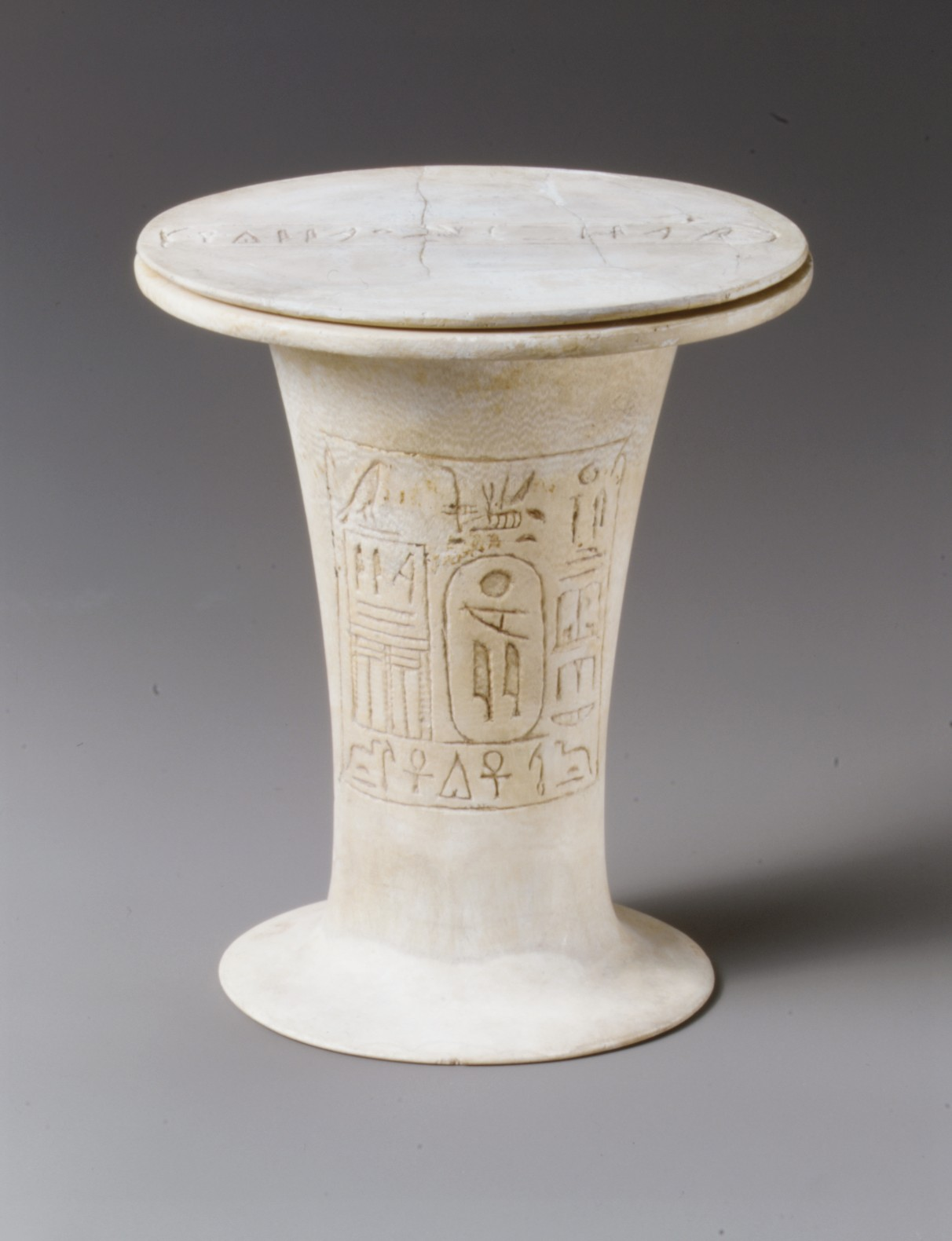
Metropolitan Museum of Art

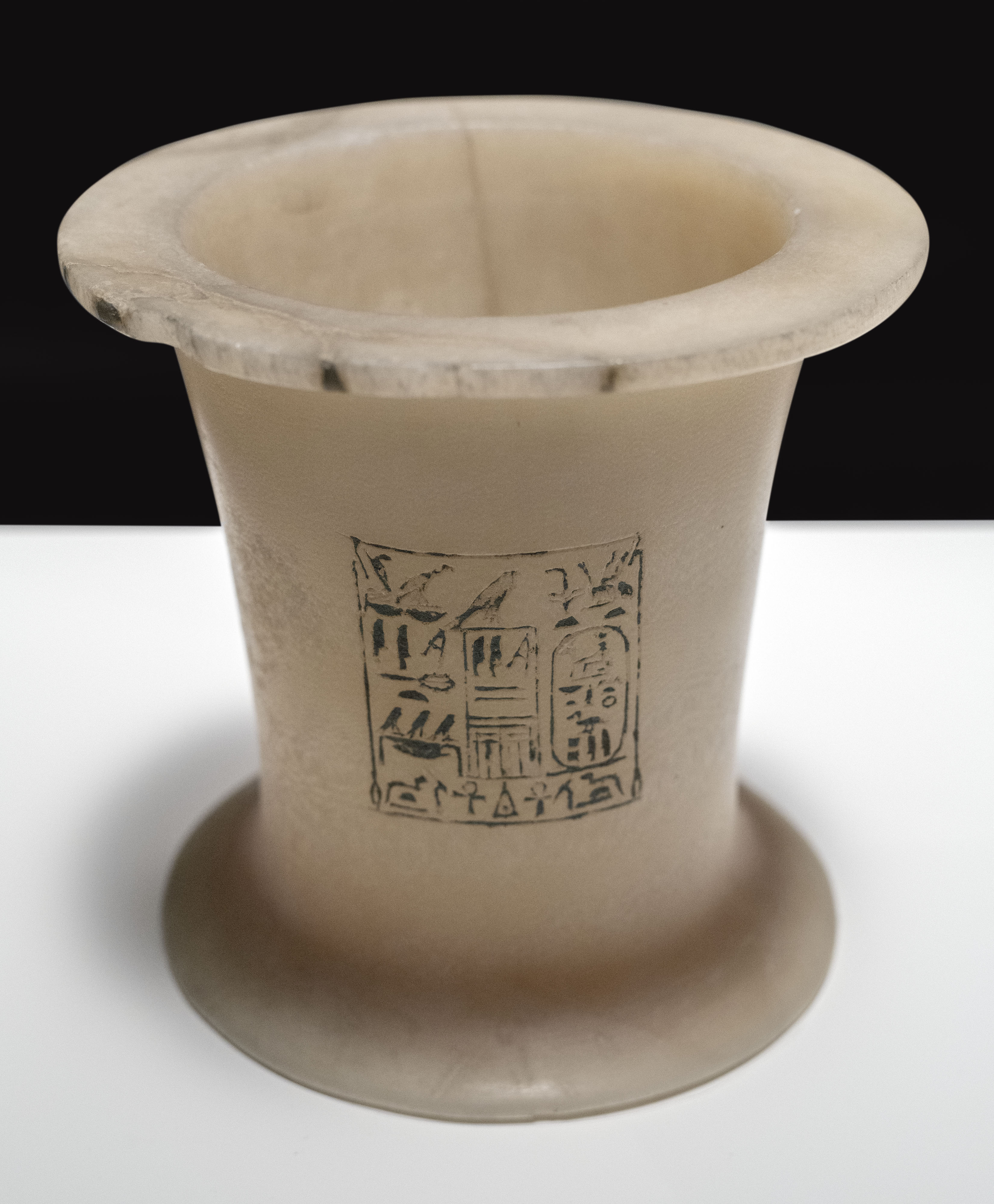
British Museum

The Sed festival had a considerable importance for Old Kingdom kings. Representations of it were part of the typical decoration of temples associated with the ruler during the Old Kingdom, whether the king had actually celebrated it or not. As further evidence of the importance of this event in Pepi's case, the state administration seems to have had a tendency to mention his first jubilee repeatedly in the years following its celebration until the end of his rule in connection with building activities. For example, Pepi's final 25th cattle count reported on the Sixth Dynasty royal annals is associated with his first Sed festival even though it probably had taken place some 19 years prior.

== Politics ==
=== Ascending the throne ===
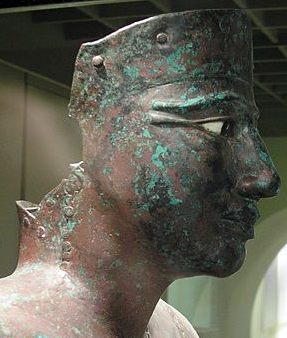
Lifesize copper statue of Pepi I, Cairo Museum

Pepi's accession to the throne may have occurred in times of discord. Manetho, writing nearly 2000 years after Pepi's reign, claims that Pepi's father Teti was assassinated by his own bodyguards. The Egyptologist Naguib Kanawati has argued in support of Manetho's claim, noting for example that Teti's reign saw a significant increase in the number of guards at the Egyptian court, who became responsible for the everyday care of the king. At the same time, the figures and names of several contemporary palace officials as represented in their tombs have been erased purposefully. This seems to be an attempt at a damnatio memoriae targeting three men in particular: the vizier Hezi, (Note: Because of a typo in Hubschmann 2011, Hezi became also known as "Heri" in various subsequent works.) the overseer of weapons Mereri and chief physician Seankhuiptah. These men could therefore be behind the regicide.

Pepi may have been too young to be king. In any case, he did not immediately succeed his father. King Userkare succeeded him instead, but Userkare's identity and relationship to the royal family remain uncertain. It is possible Userkare served only as a regent with Pepi's mother Iput as Pepi reached adulthood, occupying the throne in the interregnum until Pepi's coming of age. The apparent lack of resistance to Pepi's eventual accession supports such hypotheses.

Against this view, however, Kanawati has argued that Userkare's short reign—lasting perhaps only one year—cannot be a regency as a regent would not have assumed a full royal titulary as Userkare did, nor would he be included in king lists. Rather, Userkare could have been a usurper (Note: Pepi's claim to the throne, as the son of Iput and thus a male descendant of Unas was the strongest in Kanawati's view, implying that Userkare was an usurper.) and a descendant of a lateral branch of the Fifth Dynasty royal family who seized power briefly in a coup, possibly with the support of the priesthood of the sun god Ra. This hypothesis finds indirect evidence in Userkare's theophoric name which incorporates the name of Ra, a naming fashion common during the preceding Fifth Dynasty that had fallen out of use since Unas's reign. Further archeological evidence of Userkare's illegitimacy in the eyes of his successor is the absence of any mention of him in the tombs and biographies of the many Egyptian officials who served under both Teti and Pepi I. For example, the viziers Inumin and Khentika, who served both Teti and Pepi I, are completely silent about Userkare and none of their activities during his time on the throne are reported in their tomb. The tomb of Mehi, a guard who lived under Teti, Userkare and Pepi, yielded an inscription showing that the name of Teti was first erased to be replaced by that of another king, whose name was itself erased and replaced again by that of Teti. Kanawati argues the intervening name was that of Userkare to whom Mehi may have transferred his allegiance. Mehi's attempt to switch back to Teti was seemingly unsuccessful, as there is evidence that work on his tomb stopped abruptly and that he was never buried there.

For the Egyptologist Miroslav Bárta (cs), further troubles might have arisen directly between Pepi and relatives of his father Teti. Bárta and Baud point to Pepi's apparent decision to dismantle the funerary complex of his paternal grandmother Sesheshet, as witnessed by blocks from this queen's complex which were found reused as construction material in Pepi's own mortuary temple. On the other hand, Wilfried Seipel disagrees with this interpretation of the blocks being reused by Pepi, instead, he thinks the blocks bear witness to Pepi's foundation of a pious memorial to his grandmother. It's been noted that the reliefs of the blocks had been deliberately damaged and Verner proposed that Userkare may be responsible for this, which may explain why the blocks were reused.

At the same time as he apparently distanced himself from his father's line, Pepi transformed his mother's tomb into a pyramid and posthumously bestowed a new title on her, "Daughter of the King of Upper and Lower Egypt", thereby emphasising his royal lineage as a descendant of Unas, last ruler of the Fifth Dynasty.

Pepi chose the Horus name of Mery-tawy, meaning "He who is loved by the two lands" or "Beloved of the Two Lands", which Nicolas Grimal sees as a clear indication that he desired political appeasement in times of troubles. Similarly, Pepi chose the throne name Nefersahor, meaning "Perfect is the protection of Horus". Bárta adds that Pepi's writing of his own name "Mery-tawy" is also highly unusual: he chose to invert the order of the hieroglyphic signs composing it, placing the sign for "Beloved" before that for "Two Lands". For Bárta and Yannis Gourdon, this deliberate choice shows Pepi's deference to the powerful nobility of the country, on which he was dependent. Although there seems to be no direct relation between Userkare's brief reign and one or more later conspiracies against him, this evidence suggests some form of political instability at the time.

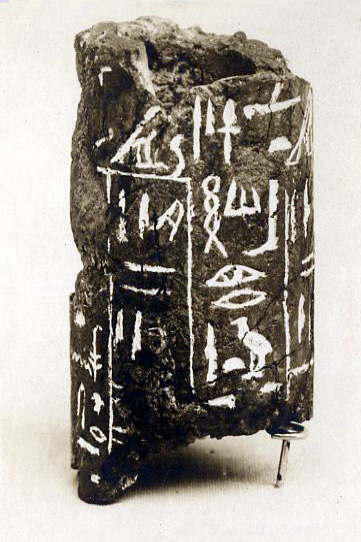
Turquoise cylinder seal of an official of Pepi I, "Sole companion, lector priest, who does what is ordered [...] privy to the secret(s) of the king"

=== Provincial administration ===
In a long trend that began earlier in the Fifth Dynasty, the Old Kingdom Egyptian state was the subject of increasing decentralisation and regionalisation. Provincial families played an increasingly important role, marrying into the royal family, accessing the highest offices of the state administration and having a strong influence at the court, while also consolidating their hold over regional power bases by creating local dynasties. These processes, well under way during Pepi I's reign, progressively weakened the king's primacy and ascendancy over his own administration and would ultimately result in the princedoms of the First Intermediate Period. Teti and Pepi I seem to have developed several policies to counteract this. They both changed the organisation of the territorial administration during their reigns: many provincial governors were nominated, especially in Upper Egypt, while Lower Egypt was possibly under direct royal administration. In addition, Pepi instigated the construction of royal Ka-chapels (Note: For the Ancient Egyptians, the Ka was the vital essence which, when it inhabited the body, made the person alive. At the death of the person, the Ka simply departed the body but continued to exist and had to be sustained through offerings, performed in the Ka-chapel associated with the tomb.) throughout Egypt to strengthen the royal presence in the provinces. These expensive policies suggest Egypt was prosperous during Pepi's reign. Small provincial centres in areas historically associated with the crown became more important, suggesting that pharaohs of the Sixth Dynasty tried to diminish the power of regional dynasties by recruiting senior officials who did not belong to them and were loyal to the pharaoh. Some of these new officials have no known background, indicating they were not of noble extraction. The circulation of high officials, who were moved from key positions of power to other duties, occurred at an "astonishing" pace under Teti and Pepi I according to the Egyptologist Juan Carlos Moreno García, in what might have been a deliberate attempt to curtail the concentration of power in the hands of a few officials.

The Sixth Dynasty royal annals, only a small part of which are still legible, record further activities during Pepi's reign, including the offering of milk and young cows for a feast of Ra, the building of a "south chapel" on the occasion of the new year and the arrival of messengers at court. Further offerings of lapis-lazuli, cattle, bread and beer are mentioned, for gods including Horus and the Ennead.

=== Harem Conspiracy ===
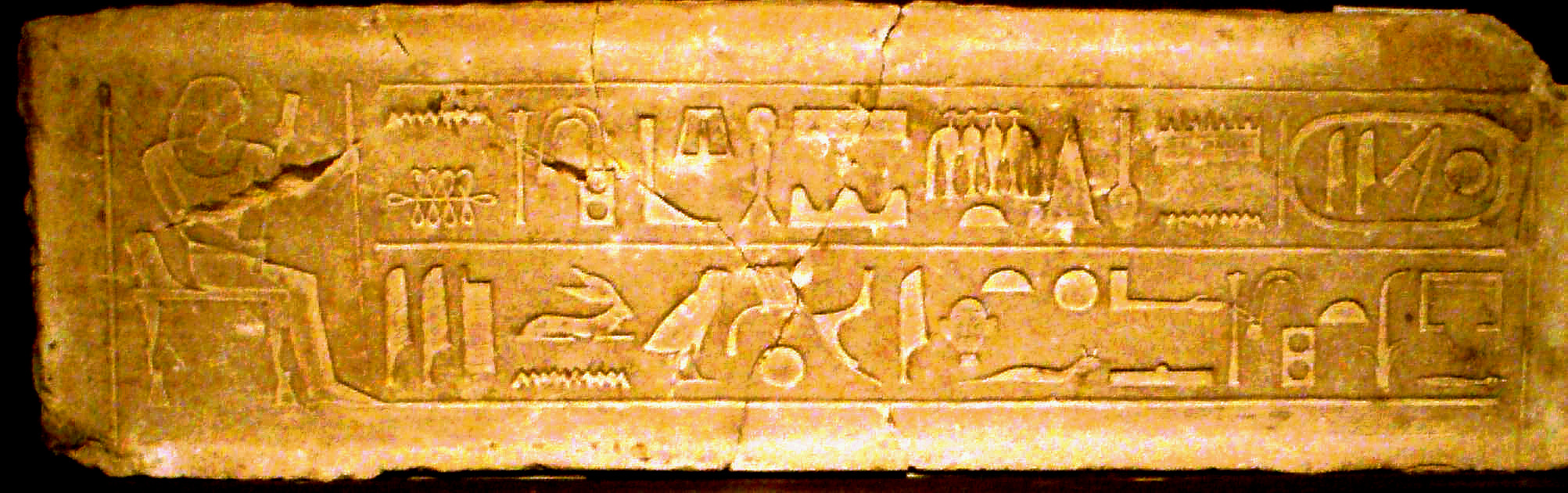
Weni shown on a lintel from his tomb with the name of Pepi I's pyramid, Pepi Men-nefer, mentioned on the top row of hieroglyphs, Rosicrucian Egyptian Museum (Note: Catalog number RC-1771.)

At some point in his reign, (Note: The precise date when Pepi faced the harem conspiracy is debated. Darrell Baker proposed that this happened early in his rule, while Hans Goedicke proposes Pepi's 21st year of reign as the terminus post quem for this conspiracy, positing that the most probable date is Pepi's 44th year on the throne.) Pepi faced a conspiracy hatched by one of his harem consorts, only known by her title "Weret-Yamtes". Although Weni, who served as a judge during the subsequent trial, does not report the precise nature of her crime, this at least shows that the person of the king was not untouchable. If the conspiracy happened early in Pepi's reign as proposed by Wilfried Seipel and Vivienne Callender, the queen concerned could have been Userkare's mother and Teti's consort rather than Pepi's. Most scholars, however, agree with Hans Goedicke's thesis that the conspiracy occurred after more than two decades into Pepi's reign. For Goedicke, the queen could have been Merenre's mother. Nicolas Grimal (Note: Hans Goedicke and Nicolas Grimal both use "Weret-Yamtes" as a proper name rather than a title, but this is strongly opposed by others including Michel Baud.) and Baud see this as highly unlikely and outright outlandish respectively, as this queen's son would have been punished along with her. Rather, the queen might have attempted unsuccessfully to secure the throne for her son, whose name is now lost.

Perhaps in response to these events, Pepi changed his prenomen Nefersahor to Meryre, meaning "Beloved of Ra", even updating the inscriptions inside his pyramid. (Note: At this point, the Ancient Egyptian royal titulary assumed its definitive standard form.) This late change with Pepi incorporating the sun god Ra's name into his own may reflect some agreement with the influential priesthood of Ra. Around this time, Pepi married two daughters of Khui, the provincial governor of Abydos. This may also have served to counteract the weakening of the king's authority over Middle and Upper Egypt by securing the allegiance of a powerful family. For Baud and Christopher Eyre, this also demonstrates that at the time of the Sixth Dynasty, government and power was still largely determined by family relationships rather than by bureaucracy.

The political importance of these marriages is furthered by the fact that for the first and last time until the 26th Dynasty some 1800 years later, a woman, Khui's wife Nebet, bore the title of vizier of Upper Egypt. Egyptologists debate whether this title was purely honorific or whether she really assumed the duties of a vizier. Later, Khui's and Nebet's son Djau was made vizier as well. Pepi's marriages might be at the origin of a trend which continued during the later Sixth and Eighth Dynasties, in which the temple of Min in Coptos—Khui's seat of power—was the focus of much royal patronage. The Coptos Decrees, which record successive pharaohs granting tax exemptions to the temple, as well as official honours bestowed by the kings on the local ruling family while the Old Kingdom society was collapsing, manifest this.

=== End of reign: coregency ===
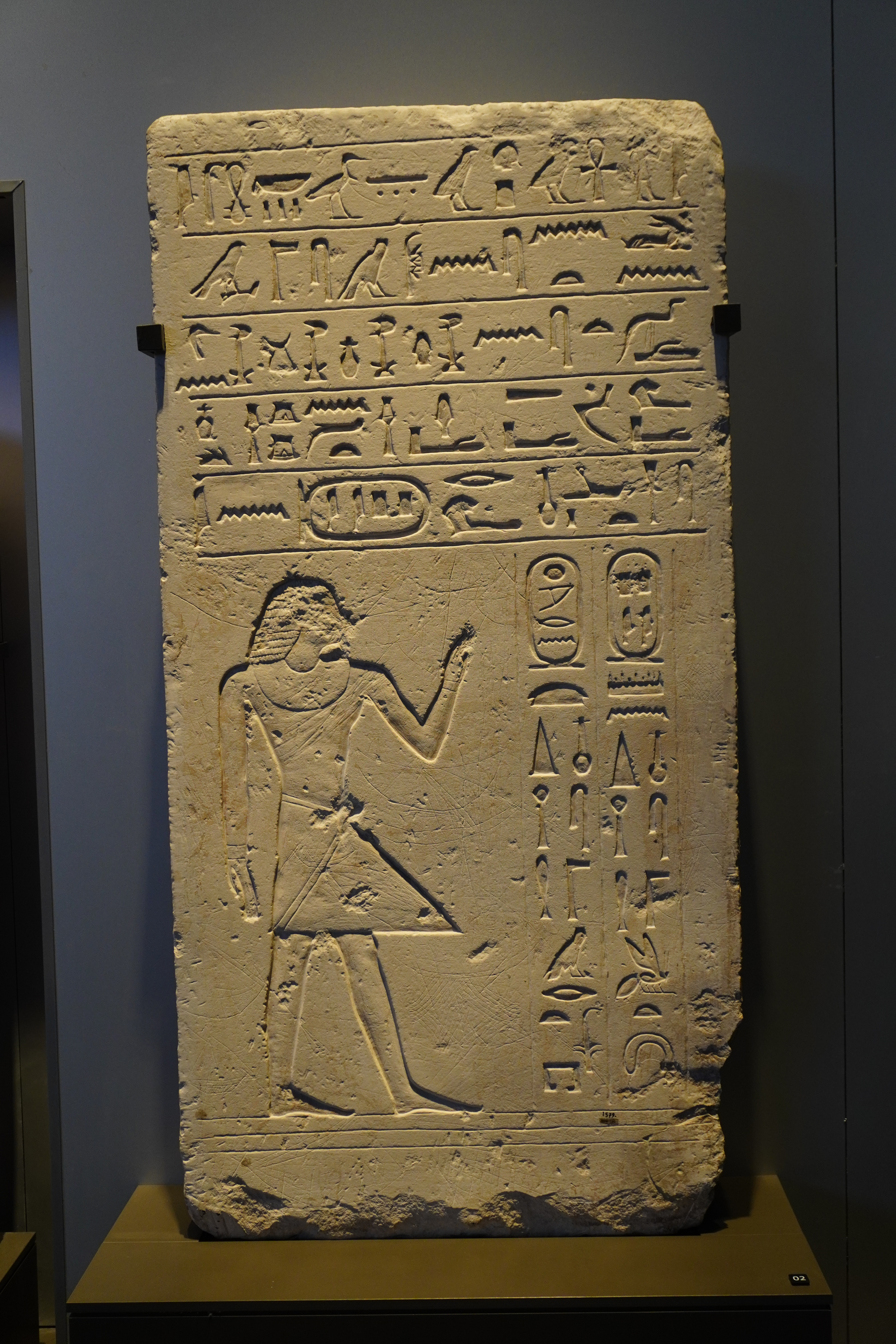
Stela mentioning the pyramids of both Pepi I Meryre and Merenre Nemtyemsaf I.

The end of Pepi's rule may have been no less troubled than his early reign, as Kanawati conjectures that Pepi faced yet another conspiracy against him, in which his vizier Rawer may have been involved. To support his theory, Kanawati observes that Rawer's image in his tomb has been desecrated, with his name, hands and feet chiselled off, while this same tomb is dated to the second half of Pepi's reign on stylistic grounds. Kanawati further posits that the conspiracy may have aimed at having someone else designated heir to the throne at the expense of Merenre. Because of this failed conspiracy, Pepi I may have taken the drastic (Note: The drastic nature of Pepi's decision—if there was a coregency—is apparent on noting the Ancient Egyptians conception of the kingship as "rulership by a single individual holding a supreme office in a lifelong tenure, most often succeeding on a hereditary principle and wielding [...] great personal power". The emphasis on a single individual holder follows from the Ancient Egyptians' perception of the king as a divine being, offspring of Ra, who upholds Egypt's unity and prosperity as well as the cosmic order preordained by the gods and playing the crucial role of mediator between the people and the gods, with the capacity of conveying the gods' messages and will. The king not only had these unique roles but the institution of kingship was perceived as a divinely established order guarding Egypt against chaos.) step of crowning Merenre during his own reign, thereby creating the earliest documented coregency in the history of Egypt with Merenre celebrating his Year 1 as junior coregent (Horus), while his father Pepi I became senior coregent (Osiris). That such a coregency took place was first proposed by Étienne Drioton. A gold pendant bearing the names of both Pepi I and Merenre I as living kings, and the copper statues of Hierakonpolis, discussed below, indirectly support this. Goedicke has suggested further that an inscription mentioning King Merenre's tenth year of reign in Hatnub, contradicting Manetho's figure of seven years, is evidence that Merenre dated the start of his reign before the end of his father's reign, as a coregency would permit.

The coregency remains uncertain. The Sixth Dynasty Royal annals bear no trace either for or against it, but the shape and size of the stone on which the annals are inscribed makes it more probable that Merenre did not start to count his years of reign until soon after the death of his father. (Note: The royal annals mention the feast of the union of the two lands concerning Merenre, a feast normally celebrated once, shortly after the death of a king with the start of his successor's reign. Since it is very unlikely that this feast was celebrated twice for Merenre (that is once at the start of the coregency and once more at the death of his father), Baud and Dobrev deem it likely that the feast happened only once at Pepi's death (as would be normal) and hence everything written on the annals after the mention of the feast must have recorded Merenre's sole reign, had there been a coregency prior to that point or not. While almost all the inscriptions pertaining to Merenre's sole reign are now illegible, the space available for them on the royal annals shows that he may have been sole king for 11 to 14 years. This can be known because every occasion of a cattle count was written in a devoted and well-delimited case in the annals, and these cases are of roughly consistent sizes, allowing a good estimation of the maximum number of illegible cases. That Merenre reigned over a decade as sole king cannot easily be reconciled with Manetho's claim that he reigned only seven years by invoking seven years of sole reign plus an additional number of years as coregent as proponents of the coregency, including Goedicke, had done.) Furthermore, William J. Murnane writes that the gold pendant's context is unknown, making its significance regarding the coregency difficult to appraise. The copper statues are similarly inconclusive as the identity of the smaller one, and whether they originally formed a group, remains uncertain.

=== Military campaigns ===
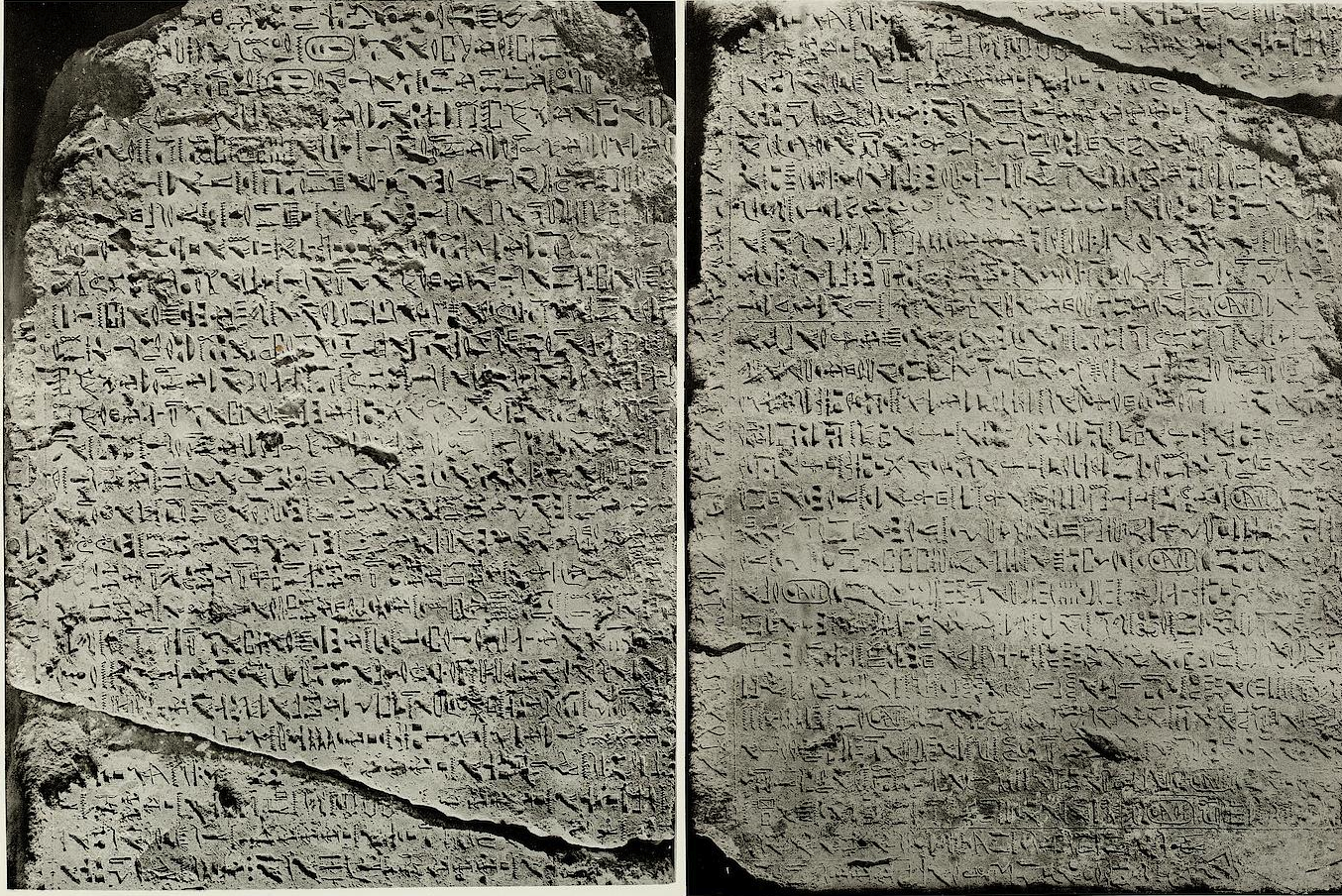
Autobiography of Weni, now at the Egyptian Museum in Cairo (Note: Catalog number CGC 1435)

Militarily, aggressive expansion into Nubia marked Pepi I's reign. The walls of the tombs of the contemporary nomarchs of Elephantine, alabaster vessels bearing Pepi's cartouche found in Kerma and inscriptions in Tumas report this. The Sixth Dynasty royal annals also recount at least one campaign into Nubia. Although the campaign narrative is now largely illegible, according to the Egyptologists Baud and Dobrev, it comprised three phases: first, messengers were sent to Nubia for negotiation and surveillance purposes; then the military campaign took place and finally a booty of men and goods was brought back to Egypt for presentation to the pharaoh.

To the north-east of Egypt, Pepi launched at least five military expeditions against the "sand dwellers" (Note: Transliteration from Ancient Egyptian ḥryw-š.) of Sinai and southern Canaan. These campaigns are recounted on the walls of the tomb of Weni, then officially a palace superintendent but given tasks befitting a general. Weni states that he ordered nomarchs in Upper Egypt and the Nile Delta region to "call up the levies of their own subordinates, and these in turn summoned their subordinates down through every level of the local administration". Meanwhile, Nubian mercenaries were also recruited and endowed with the power to enroll men and seize goods, (Note: The Dashur decree of Pepi I shows that such mercenaries were already "pacified", integrated into Egyptian society, for example in pyramid towns, where they served as policemen and soldiers.) so that in total tens of thousands of men were at Weni's disposal. This is the only text relating the raising of an Egyptian army during the Old Kingdom, and it indirectly reveals the absence of a permanent, standing army at the time. The goal of this army was either to repulse rebelling Semitic people (Note: Transliteration from Ancient Egyptian 3'mu often translated "Semite".) or to seize their properties and conquer their land in southern Canaan, (Note: Or, much less likely, in the Eastern Nile Delta.) an action possibly motivated by the intense commercial activities between Egypt and this region. The Egyptians campaigned up to what was probably Mount Carmel or Ras Kouroun, landing troops on the coast using transport boats. Weni reports that walled towns were destroyed, fig trees and grape vines were cut down, and local shrines were burned.

== Economy ==
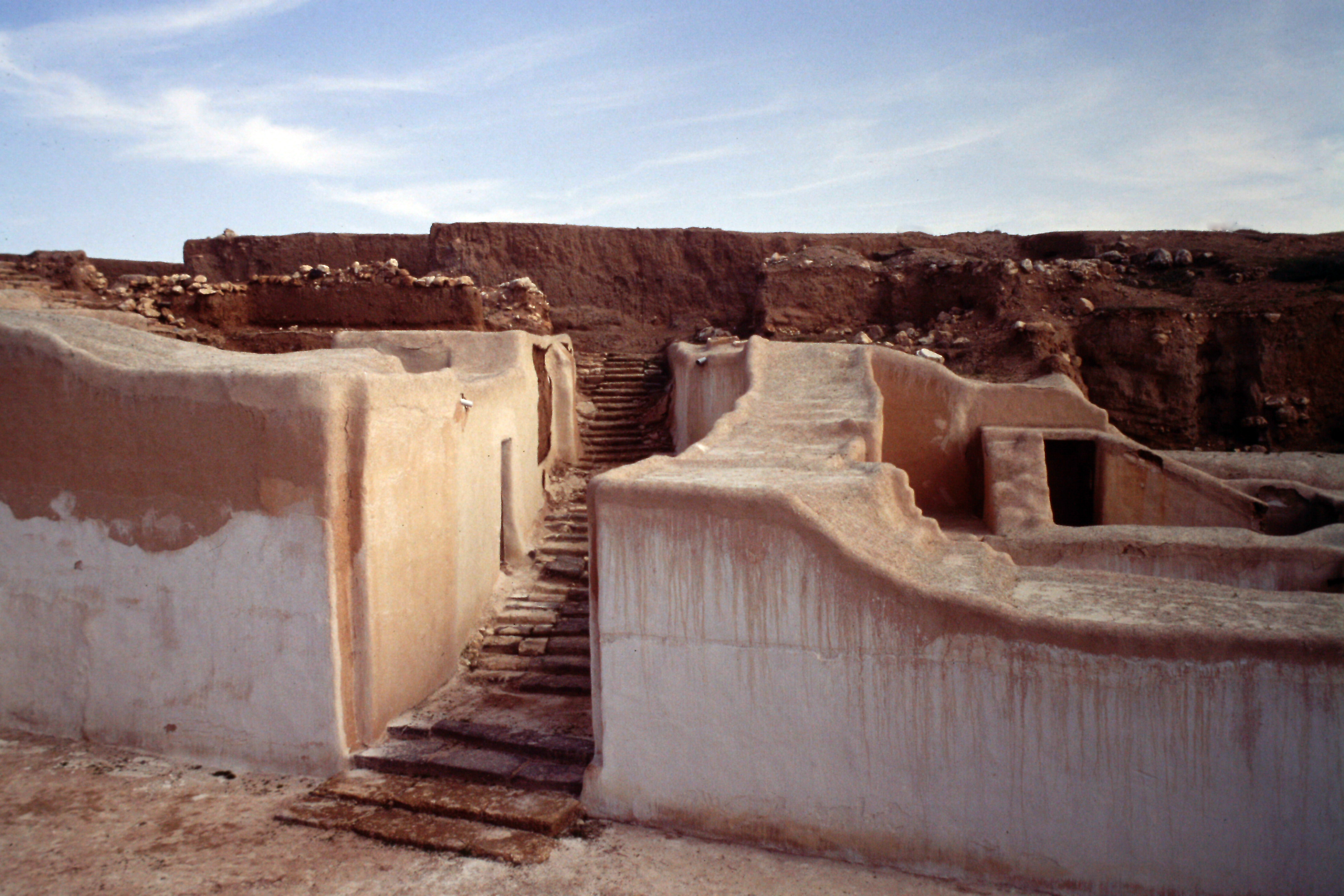
Ebla's royal palace, destroyed c. 2300 BC

The reign of Pepi I marks the apogee of the Sixth Dynasty foreign policy, with flourishing trade, several mining and quarrying expeditions and major military campaigns.

=== Foreign trade and mining ===
Trade with settlements along the Levantine coast, which had existed during the Fifth Dynasty, seems to have peaked under Pepi I and Pepi II. Their chief trade partner there might have been Byblos, where dozens of inscriptions on stone vessels showing Pepi's cartouches have been found, and a large alabaster vessel bearing Pepi's titulary and commemorating his jubilee from the Temple of Baalat Gebal. (Note: A stone vessel bearing Pepi's name has been dated precisely to Byblos' KIV phase.) The high official, Iny, served Pepi during several successful expeditions to Byblos for which the king rewarded him with the name "Inydjefaw", meaning, "He who brings back provisions". Through Byblos, Egypt, possibly as Dugurasu, had indirect contacts with the city of Ebla in modern-day Syria. (Note: Pepi is concurrent with Ebla's IIIB.1 phase.) The contact with Ebla is established by alabaster vessels bearing Pepi's name found near its royal palace G, (Note: For example, an alabaster lid of a precious vessel is inscribed with, "Beloved of the two lands, king of Upper and Lower Egypt, the son of Hathor, lady of Dendera, Pepi." As Hathor was the chief deity of Byblos, it is probable that this vessel was destined to this city and was only later exchanged or given to Ebla.) destroyed in the 23rd century BC, possibly by the Akkadian Empire under Sargon. Trading parties departed Egypt for the Levant from a Nile Delta port called Ra-Hat, "the first mouth [of the Nile]". This trade benefited the nearby city of Mendes, from which one of Pepi's viziers probably originated. Further contacts with Canaan may be inferred from a statue of Pepi, which is said to have been unearthed in Gezer but has since been lost.

Expeditions and mining activities that were already taking place in the Fifth and early Sixth Dynasty continued unabated. These include at least one expedition of workmen and their military escort to the mines of turquoise and copper in Wadi Maghareh, Sinai, around Pepi's 36th year on the throne. (Note: More precisely, the expedition is dated to Pepi's 18th cattle count, fifth day of the fourth month of Shemu, which might correspond to his 36th year of reign, some time between the July 26 and August 4 of that year.) In all likelihood, this expedition departed Egypt from the Red Sea coast port of Ayn Soukhna, which was active during Pepi's reign. The same port may also have been the origin of an expedition to the southern Red Sea, possibly to Punt, as witnessed by Ethiopian obsidian discovered on the site. There were also one or more expeditions to Hatnub, where alabaster was extracted at least once in Pepi's 49th year of reign, as well as visits to the Gebel el-Silsila and Sehel Island. A trading expedition fetching lapis-lazuli and lead or tin may also have passed further south through Mirgissa. (Note: The geographical destination of this expedition, mentioned on the funerary texts of an Egyptian official, is uncertain. It may instead have taken place in the Levant.) Greywacke and siltstone for building projects originated from quarries of the Wadi Hammamat, where some eighty graffiti mention Pepi I. At the same time, an extensive network of caravan routes traversed Egypt's Western Desert, for example, from Abydos to the Kharga Oasis and from there to the Dakhla and Selima Oases.

=== Domestic policies ===
Agricultural estates affiliated with the crown in the provinces during the preceding dynasty were replaced by novel administrative entities, the ḥwt, which were agricultural centres controlling tracts of land, livestock and workers. Together with temples and royal domains, these numerous ḥwt represented a network of warehouses accessible to royal envoys and from which taxes and labor could easily be collected. This territorial mode of organisation disappeared nearly 300 years after Pepi I's reign, at the dawn of the Middle Kingdom period.

Pepi decreed tax-exemptions to various institutions. He gave an exemption to a chapel dedicated to the cult of his mother located in Coptos. (Note: The decree recording this, called a Coptos Decree in modern Egyptology, is now in the Egyptian Museum, Cairo, catalog number 41890.) Another decree has survived on a stele discovered near the Bent Pyramid in Dashur, whereby in his 21st year of reign, Pepi grants exemptions to the people serving in the two pyramids towns (Note: Pyramid towns are areas of accommodation for workers who build pyramids and all craftsmen needed to sustain the construction effort including bakers, carpenters, water carriers and more. These towns continued to be used after the end of the pyramid construction.) of Sneferu:

My majesty has commanded that these two pyramid towns be exempt for him throughout the course of eternity from doing any work of the palace, from doing any forced labor for any part of the royal residence throughout the course of eternity, or from doing any forced labor at the word of anybody in the course of eternity.

The Egyptologist David Warburton sees such perpetual tax exemptions as capitulations by a king confronted with rampant corruption. Whether they were the result of religious or political motives, exemptions created precedents that encouraged other institutions to request similar treatment, weakening the power of the state as they accumulated over time.

Further domestic activities related to agriculture and the economy may be inferred from the inscriptions found in the tomb of Nekhebu, a high official belonging to the family of Senedjemib Inti, a vizier during the late Fifth Dynasty. Nekhebu reports overseeing the excavations of canals in Lower Egypt and at Cusae in Middle Egypt.

== Building activities ==
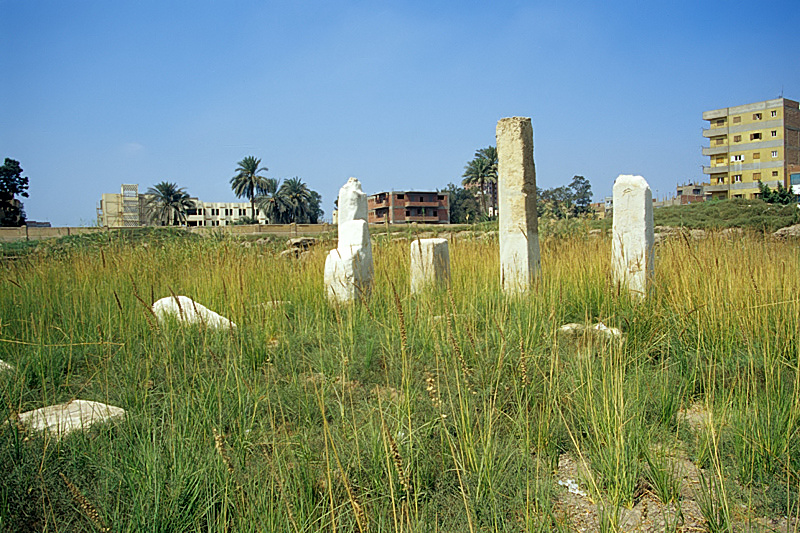
Ruins of Pepi I's Ka-chapel in Bubastis

Pepi I built extensively throughout Egypt, so much so that in 1900 the Egyptologist Flinders Petrie stated "this king has left more monuments, large and small, than any other ruler before the Twelfth Dynasty". The Egyptologist Jean Leclant reached a similar conclusion in 1999. He sees Pepi's rule as marking the apogee of the Old Kingdom owing to the flurry of building activities, administrative reforms, trade and military campaigns at the time. Pepi devoted most of his building efforts to local cults and royal Ka-chapels, seemingly with the objective of affirming the king's stature and presence in the provinces.

=== Ka-chapels ===
Ka-chapels were small cult buildings comprising one or more chambers to hold offerings dedicated to the cult of the Ka of a deceased or, in this case, the king. Such chapels dedicated to Pepi I were uncovered or are known from contemporary sources to have stood in Hierakonpolis, in Abydos, (Note: A chapel in Akhmim attributed to a king "Pepi" might belong to Pepi II.) and in the central Nile Delta region, in Memphis, Zawyet el-Meytin, Assiut, Qus and beyond the Nile Valley in Balat, a settlement of the Dakhla Oasis. In addition, two chapels were built in Bubastis and probably more than one stood in Dendera. (Note: Pepi might have built more than one chapel there, as he seems to have been particularly interested in the cult of Hathor of Dendera, presenting himself as the son of Hathor of Dendera in numerous inscriptions including on vessels traded abroad.) Finally, yet another chapel is believed to have existed in Elkab, where rock inscriptions refer to his funerary cult. All these buildings were probably peripheral to or inside larger temples hosting extensive cult activities. For example, the chapel at Abydos was next to the temple of Khenti-Amentiu. For the Egyptologist Juan Moreno García, this proximity demonstrates the direct power that the king still held over the temples' economic activities and internal affairs during the Sixth Dynasty.

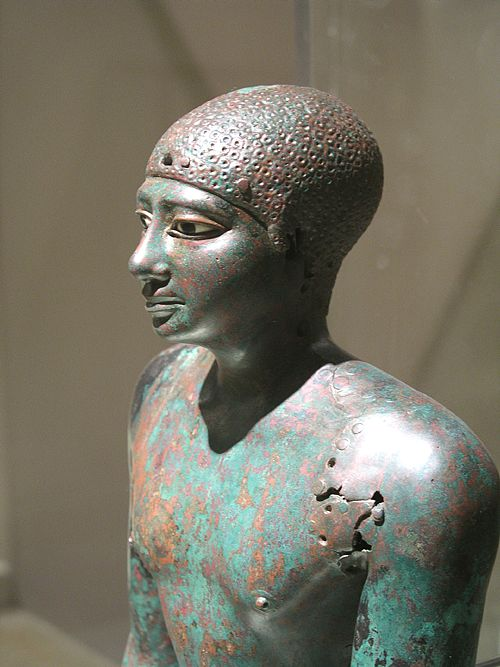
The smaller copper statue from Hierakonpolis, representing Merenre or a young Pepi I

In an underground store beneath the floor of Hierakonpolis' Ka-chapel of Pepi, the Egyptologist James Quibell uncovered a statue of King Khasekhemwy of the Second Dynasty, a terracotta lion cub made during the Thinite era, a golden mask representing Horus and two copper statues. Originally fashioned by hammering plates of copper over a wooden base, these statues had been disassembled, placed inside one another and then sealed with a thin layer of engraved copper bearing the titles and names of Pepi I "on the first day of the Heb Sed" feast. The two statues were symbolically "trampling underfoot the Nine bows"—the enemies of Egypt—a stylized representation of Egypt's conquered foreign subjects. While the identity of the larger adult figure as Pepi I is revealed by the inscription, the identity of the smaller statue showing a younger person remains unresolved. The most common hypothesis among Egyptologists is that the young man shown is Merenre. As Alessandro Bongioanni and Maria Croce write: "[Merenre] was publicly associated as his father's successor on the occasion of the Jubilee [the Heb Sed feast]. The placement of his copper effigy inside that of his father would therefore reflect the continuity of the royal succession and the passage of the royal sceptre from father to son before the death of the pharaoh could cause a dynastic split." Alternatively, Bongioanni and Croce have also proposed the smaller statue may represent "a more youthful Pepy I, reinvigorated by the celebration of the Jubilee ceremonies".

=== Temples ===
The close association between Ka-chapels and temples to deities might have spurred building activities for the latter. For example, the Bubastis ensemble of Pepi I comprised a 95 m × 60 m (312 ft × 197 ft) enclosure wall with a small rectangular Ka-chapel housing eight pillars near its north corner. This ensemble was peripheral to the main Old Kingdom temple dedicated to the goddess Bastet. In Dendera, where a fragmentary statue of a seated Pepi I has been uncovered, Pepi restored the temple complex to the goddess Hathor. He seems particularly to have desired to be associated with her, using the epithet "son of Hathor of Dendera" on numerous vessels found throughout Egypt and abroad. In Abydos, he built a small rock cut chapel dedicated to the local god Khenti-Amentiu, where he is again referred to as "Pepi, son of Hathor of Dendera". Pepi also referred to himself as the son of Atum of Heliopolis, direct evidence for the strengthening of the Heliopolitan cults at the time.

At the southern border of Egypt, in Elephantine, several faience plaques bearing Pepi's cartouche have been uncovered in the temple of Satet. These may suggest royal interest in the local cult. An alabaster statue of an ape with its offspring bearing Pepi I's cartouche was uncovered in the same location, but it was probably a gift of the king to a high official who then dedicated it to Satet. In this temple, Pepi built a red granite naos, destined either to house the goddess's statue, or a statue of Pepi I himself, which would mean the naos was yet another Ka-chapel. Pepi I's cartouche and the epithet "beloved of Satet" is inscribed on the naos, which stands 1.32 m (4.3 ft) high. Pepi seems to have undertaken wider works in the temple, possibly reorganising its layout by adding walls and an altar. In this context, the faience tablets bearing his cartouche may be foundation offerings made at the start of the works, although this has been contested. For the Egyptologist David Warburton, the reigns of Pepi I and II mark the first period during which small stone temples dedicated to local deities were built in Egypt.

=== Pyramid complex ===
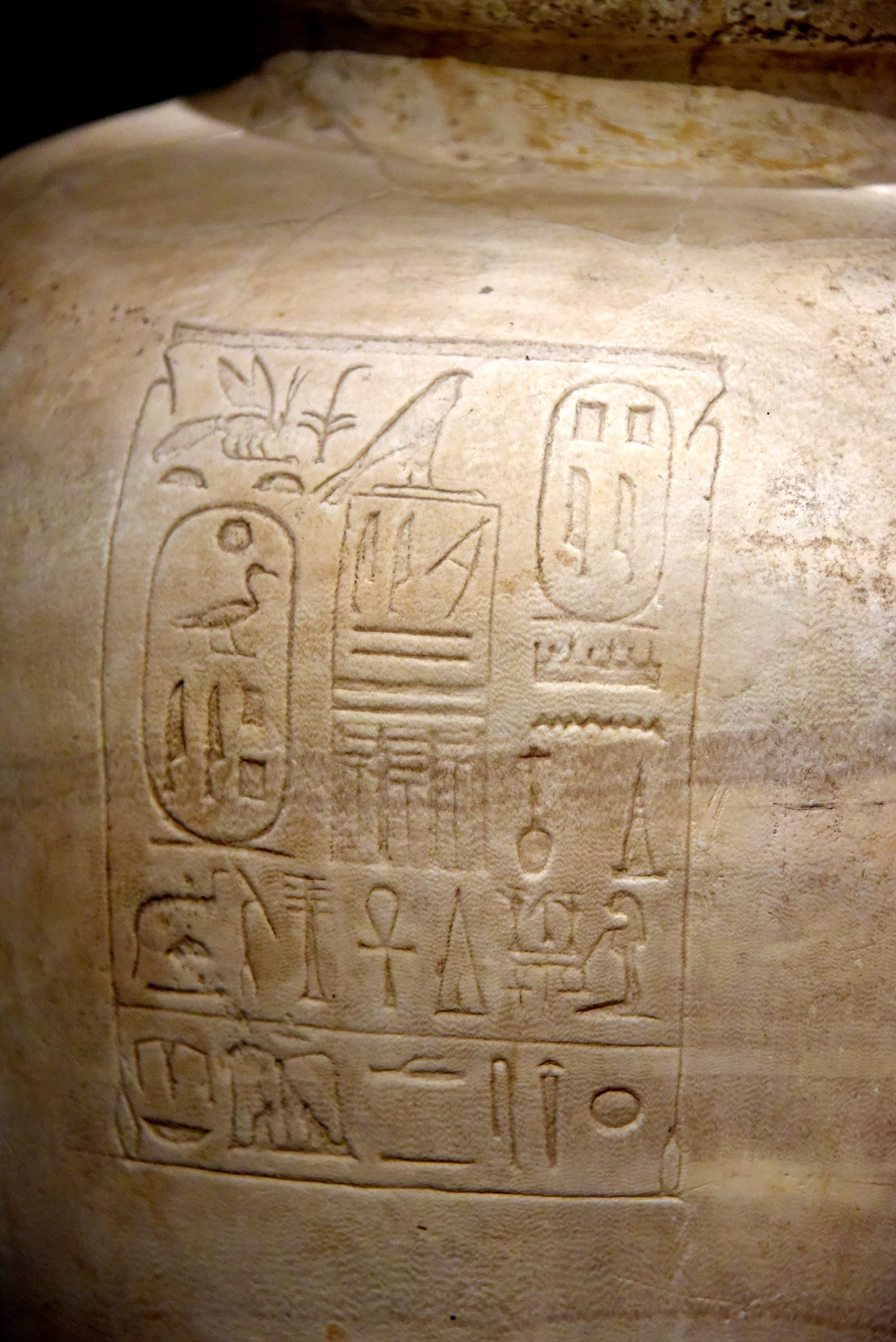
Calcite-alabaster jar mentioning the cartouches of Pepi I, the name of his pyramid complex and his first Sed festival, Neues Museum, Berlin

Pepi I had a pyramid complex built for himself in South Saqqara, which he named Men-nefer-Pepi variously translated as "Pepi's splendour is enduring", "The perfection of Pepi is established", "The beauty of Pepi endures", or "The perfection of Pepi endures". The shortened name Mennefer for the pyramid complex progressively became the name of the nearby capital of Egypt—which had originally been called Ineb-hedj. In particular, the Egyptian Mennefer ultimately gave Memphis in Greek, a name which is still in use for this ancient city. (Note: The linguistic evolution from the name of Pepi's pyramid to the Greek word Memphis is well understood in modern Egyptology and reconstructed as "Mn-nfr ~ *Mĭ́ n-năfăr > *Mĕ́ mfĕ ~ Μέμφις → Mn-nfrw~ *Mĭn-nắ frŭw > *Mĕn-nŏ́ frĕ ~ ( * ) Μένοφρις".) Pepi I's mortuary complex is neighboured on its south-west corner by a necropolis built during his own reign and the reigns of Merenre and Pepi II. The necropolis housed the pyramids of Pepi I's consorts and their dedicated funerary temples. (Note: The tombs of Meritites and Ankhesenpepi III, both built after Pepi's reign, and tombs from later periods of Egyptian history in the necropolis are not discussed here.)

==== Main pyramid ====
Pepi's main pyramid was constructed in the same fashion as royal pyramids since the reign of Djedkare Isesi some 80 years earlier: a core built six steps high from small roughly dressed blocks of limestone bound together using clay mortar encased with fine limestone blocks. The pyramid, now destroyed, had a base length of 78.75 m (258 ft; 150 cu) converging to the apex at ~ 53° and once stood 52.5 m (172 ft; 100 cu) tall. Its remains now form a meager mound of 12 m (39 ft; 23 cu), containing a pit in its centre dug by stone thieves.

The substructure of the pyramid was accessed from the north chapel which has since disappeared. From the entrance, a descending corridor gives way to a vestibule leading into the horizontal passage. Halfway along the passage, three granite portcullises guard the chambers. As in preceding pyramids, the substructure contains three chambers: an antechamber on the pyramids vertical axis, a serdab with three recesses to its east, and a burial chamber containing the king's sarcophagus to the west. Extraordinarily, the pink granite canopic chest that is sunk into the floor at the foot of the sarcophagus has remained undisturbed. Discovered alongside it was a bundle of viscera presumed to belong to the pharaoh. The provenance of a mummy fragment and fine linen wrappings discovered in the burial chamber are unknown, but they are hypothesized to belong to Pepi I.

The walls of Pepi I's antechamber, burial chamber, and much of the corridor (Note: The corridor texts in Pepi I's pyramid are the most extensive, covering the whole horizontal passage, the vestibule, and even a section of the descending corridor. Unas' pyramid constrained the texts to the south section of the corridor, as did Teti's. The texts in Merenre I's and Pepi II's pyramids covered the entire corridor and the vestibule.) are covered with vertical columns of inscribed hieroglyphic text. The hieroglyphs are painted green with ground malachite and gum arabic, a colour symbolising renewal. His sarcophagus is also inscribed on its east side with the king's titles and names, as part of a larger set of spells that includes texts at the bottom of the north and south walls opposite the sarcophagus, and in a line running across the top of the north, west, and south walls of the chamber. The writing comprises 2,263 columns and lines of text from 651 spells, of which 82 are unique to Pepi's pyramid. This is the most extensive corpus of Pyramid Texts from the Old Kingdom. The tradition of inscribing texts inside the pyramid was begun by Unas at the end of the Fifth Dynasty, but originally discovered in Pepi I's pyramid in 1880. Their function, like that of all funerary literature, was to enable the reunion of the ruler's ba and Ka, leading to the transformation into an akh, and to secure eternal life among the gods in the sky. The only known pharaonic curse found from the Old Kingdom can also be found in Pepi's pyramid, where one of the passages of the Pyramid Texts gives the warning to anyone who disturbs the tomb: "He who shall give his finger against this pyramid and this god's enclosure of Pepi and of his ka, he has given his finger against Horus’s Enclosure in the Cool Waters. Nephthys shall traverse for him every place of his [father] Geb. His case has been heard by the Ennead and he has nothing, he has no house. He is one accursed, he is one who eats his own body."

==== Mortuary temple ====
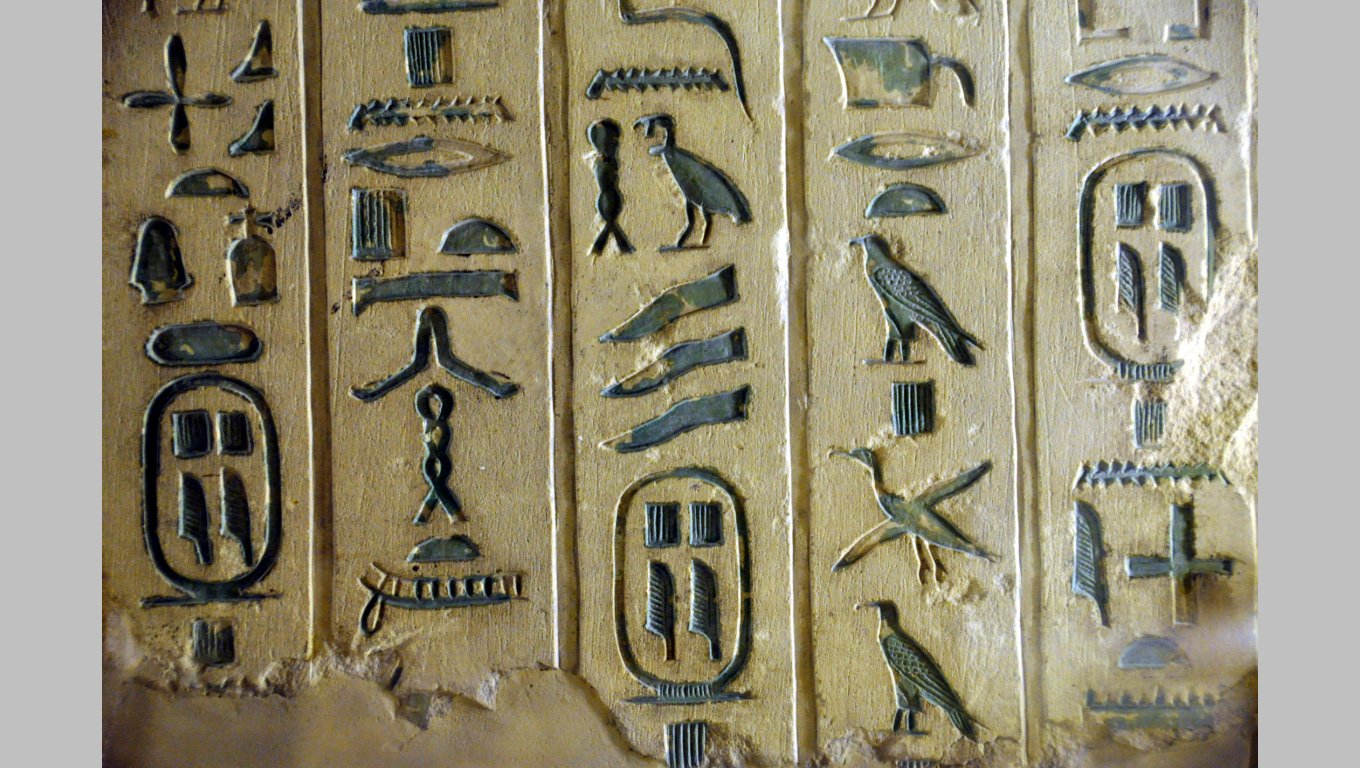
Fragments of the pyramid texts from Pepi I's pyramid in South Saqqara, now in the Petrie Museum (Note: Catalog number UC14540.)

Pepi's pyramid was part of a wider funerary complex comprising a small cult pyramid and mortuary temple surrounded by an enclosure wall. The purpose of the cult pyramid remains unclear. While it had a burial chamber, it was never used as such and must have been a purely symbolic structure. It may have hosted the pharaoh's Ka, or a miniature statue of the king, and could have been used for ritual performances centring around the burial and resurrection of the Ka spirit during the Sed festival. Excavations of the small cult pyramid yielded statue fragments, pieces of stelae and offering tables which indicate the continuation of Pepi's funerary cult into the Middle Kingdom.

A valley temple by the Nile and a causeway leading from this temple up to the pyramid on the desert plateau completed the overall construction. The high temple, next to the pyramid, was laid out according to a standard plan, making it nearly the same as the temples of Djedkare Isesi, Unas, and Teti. The temple had an entrance hall some 6.29 m (20.6 ft) high, now almost completely destroyed, leading into an open columned courtyard. Storage rooms to the north and south flanked the hall. The inner temple contained a chapel with five statue niches, an offering hall and other core chambers. Either the mortuary temple or the causeway might have been lined with statues of kneeling bound captives representing Egypt's traditional enemies. Both the temple and the causeway are now heavily damaged due the activity of lime makers, who extracted and burned the construction stones to turn them into mortar and whitewash in later times. In particular, the original location of the statues remains uncertain as they had been displaced, ready to be thrown into a lime furnace.

=== Necropolis of Pepi I ===
Pepi's mortuary complex was the centre of a wider necropolis which comprised the tombs of the royal family and further afield those of the high officials of the state administration including a tomb for Weni. Pepi had pyramids built for his consorts to the south and south-west of his pyramid. These were all located outside the complex' enclosure wall but inside an area delimited by a street to the west. Three of the main queens' pyramids were built in a row on an east–west axis, each with a base side dimension of about 20 m (66 ft). The Ancient Egyptians referred to the owners of these pyramids as the "Queen of the East", "Queen of the Centre" and "Queen of the West".

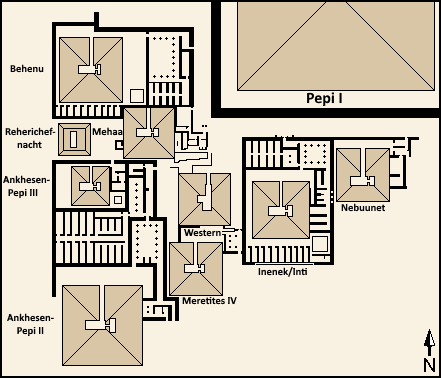
Layout of the necropolis of Pepi I

==== Pyramid of Nebwenet ====
The pyramid of the queen of the east belonged to Nebwenet, whose name, image and titles are preserved on a fallen jamb uncovered in the attached mortuary temple. The pyramid had a base of 26.2 m (86 ft), making it similar in size to the other pyramids of the necropolis. On its northern face was a small mudbrick chapel, which hosted a limestone altar, now broken. The pyramid's substructures were accessed from a descending passageway leading first to an antechamber and, from there, to the burial chamber slightly to the south of the pyramid's apex. This chamber yielded fragments of pink granite sarcophagus and pieces of inscribed alabaster. To the east was a serdab and the scant remnants of funerary equipment.

==== Pyramid of Inenek-Inti ====
Immediately west of the pyramid of the queen of the east was the pyramid of the queen of the centre, Inenek-Inti. The name, image and titles of this queen are inscribed on jambs and two 2.2 m (7.2 ft) high red-painted obelisks on either side of the gateway to the mortuary temple, establishing that Inenek-Inti was buried there. With a base of 22.53 m (73.9 ft), the pyramid size and layout is similar to that of Nebwenet, except that the burial chamber is located precisely beneath the pyramid apex. Fragments of a greywacke sarcophagus and pieces of stone vessels were uncovered there. Unlike Ankhesenpepi II's burial chamber, that of Inenek-Inti had no inscriptions on its walls. Inenek's mortuary temple was much larger than Nebwenet's, surrounding her pyramid on its eastern, northern and southern sides. Inenek's complex also comprised a small cult pyramid, 6.3 m (21 ft) at the base, on the south-east corner of the mortuary temple.

==== Queen of the West ====
West of Inenek's pyramid is that of the queen of the west. The identity of this pyramid's owner is preserved on an obelisk in front of her pyramid only as "the eldest daughter of the king". The pyramid had a base length of around 20 m (66 ft), similar to those of Inenek and Nebwenet, and now stands 3 m (9.8 ft) tall. Entry into the substructure is gained on the north face. The burial chamber is located under the vertical axis of the pyramid. The location of the serdab is unusual, being to the south of the burial chamber instead of east. Substantial remains of funerary equipment were found inside including wooden weights, ostrich feathers, copper fish hooks, and fired-clay vessels, but none bore their owner's name. It has a hastily built mortuary temple, with an offering hall and a room with two statue niches. Relief fragments discovered depict scenes of processions and estates, along with an incomplete cartouche of Pepi I's name.

==== Pyramid of Ankhesenpepi II ====
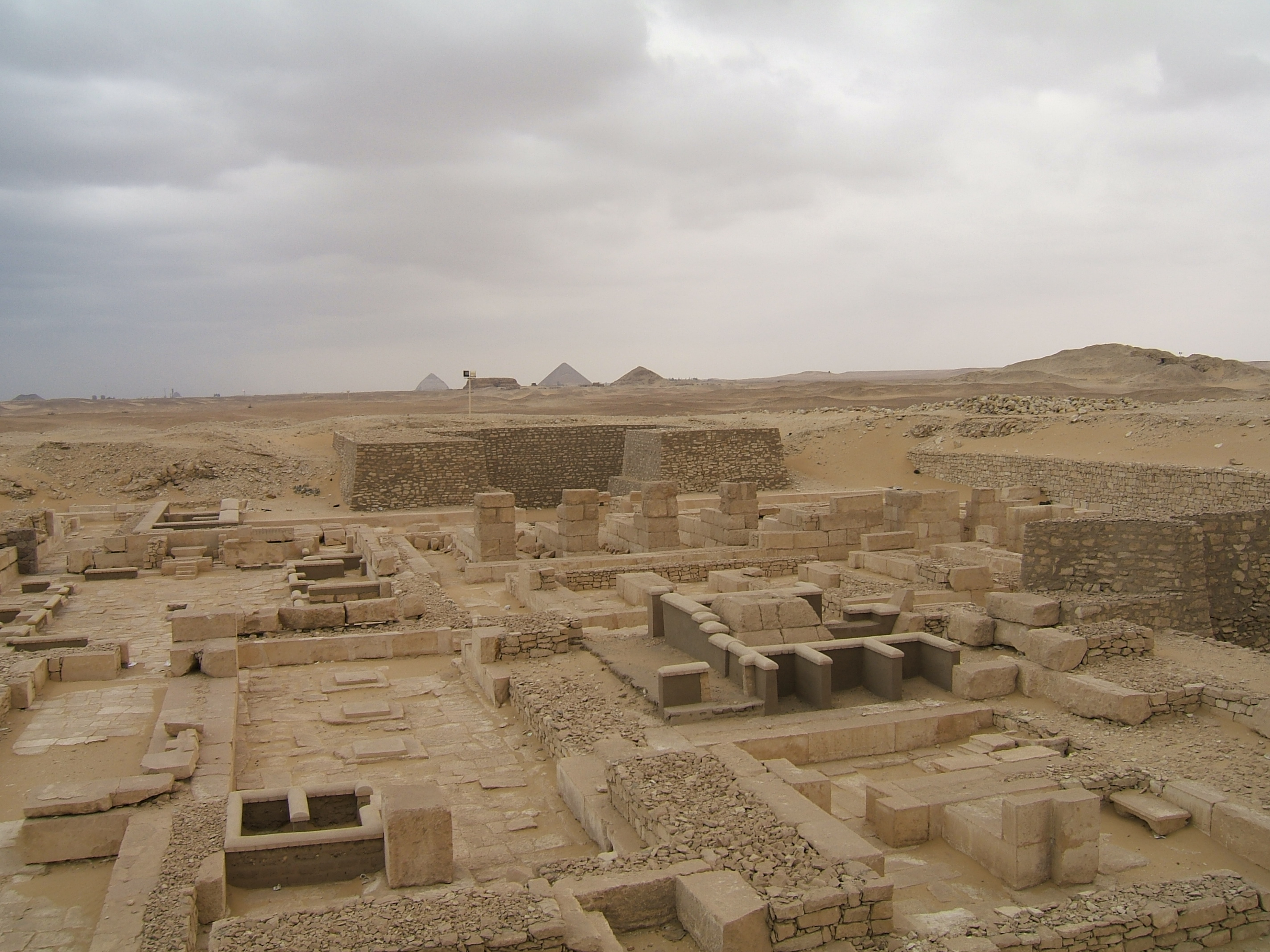
View of the pyramids and temples of Ankhesenpepi II and III in the necropolis of Pepi I

The pyramid of Ankhesenpepi II occupies the south-western extremity of the necropolis of Pepi I. With a base of 31.4 m (103 ft), the pyramid once reached 30 m (98 ft) high, making it the largest of the queens' pyramids. The funerary complex of Ankhesenpepi II was also the largest in the necropolis except for that of Pepi himself, covering an area of 3,500 m^{2} (38,000 ft^{2}). It comprised a mortuary temple to the north of the pyramid and 20 storage rooms for offerings. The queen's funerary complex had a monumental entrance with a granite frame, its lintel bearing the queen's name and titles being more than 3.6 m (12 ft) wide and weighing over 17 tons. A small chapel stood on the pyramid northern face, at the entrance of the substructures. Painted reliefs of which only scant remains have been found including a small scene depicting the queen and a princess on a boat among papyrus plants, adorned the accompanying funerary temple. The burial chamber walls were inscribed with spells from the pyramid texts, a privilege that had been the preserve of kings. Fragments from a black basalt sarcophagus were uncovered onsite.

==== Pyramid of Behenu ====
With a base of 26.2 m (86 ft), Queen Behenu's pyramid was of similar size and layout to the other queens' pyramids of the necropolis. Located on the western end of the necropolis, immediately north-west of Mehaa's tomb on which it intrudes, Behenu's mortuary temple was on the pyramid's southern face with a cult pyramid on its south-east corner. The entrance of the temple, flanked with two granite obelisks, led to several rooms, which once housed statues and offering altars, while a further 10 rooms served for storage. The burial chamber measured 6.24 m × 2.88 m (20.5 ft × 9.4 ft), and its walls were inscribed with numerous spells of the pyramid texts. The head of a wooden statue of the queen as well as her opened basalt sarcophagus were unearthed there.

==== Pyramid of Mehaa ====
Pepi's consort Mehaa was buried in a pyramid on the south-west corner of Pepi's enclosure wall. Directly adjacent to Mehaa's pyramid's eastern face was her mortuary temple, where a relief bearing the name and image of Prince Hornetjerykhet, her son, was uncovered. Mehaa's pyramid is intruded upon by the pyramid of Behenu, establishing that Mehaa was a consort of Pepi I early in his reign while Behenu lived in the later part of his rule.

== Legacy ==
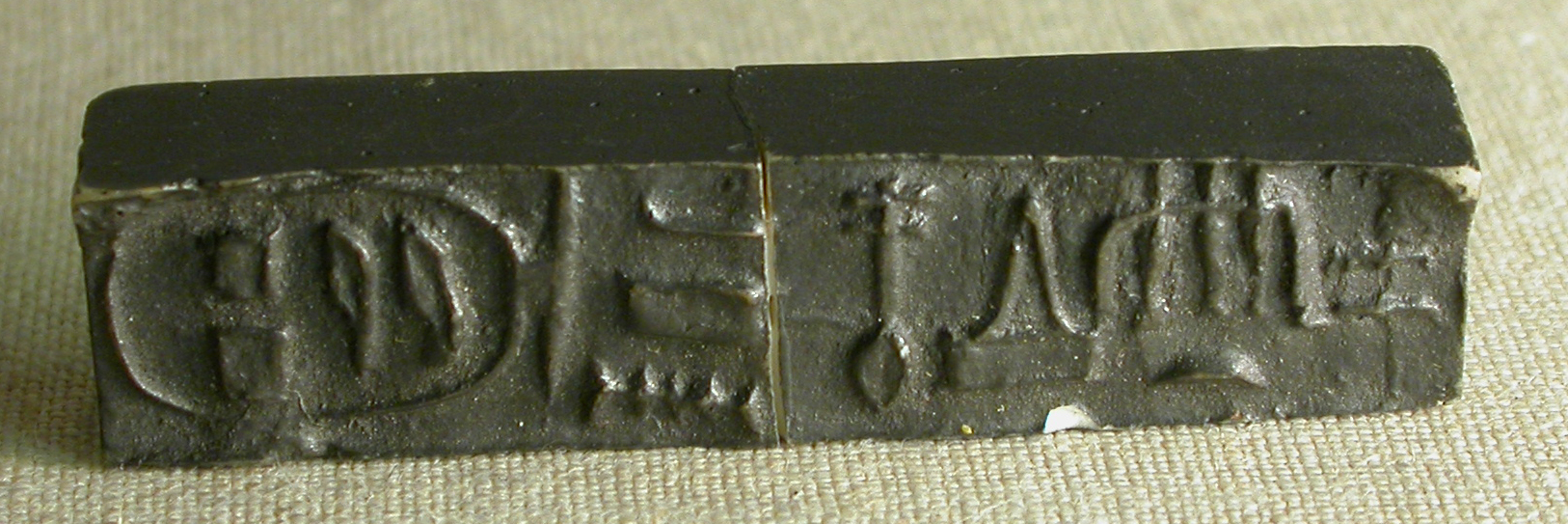
Steatite cylinder seal belonging to a land tenant serving in Pepi's pyramid complex

=== Old Kingdom ===
Pepi I was the object of a funerary cult after his death. For the remainder of the Old Kingdom period, the funerary cult of Pepi had active priests even outside of his Saqqara mortuary complex, for example inscriptions in Elkab attest to the presence of priests of his cult officiating in or in the vicinity of the local temple of Nekhbet. The ritual activities taking place in his main funerary complex continued up until the Middle Kingdom. This means that Pepi's cult continued to be celebrated during the First Intermediate Period, a period during which the Egyptian state seems to have collapsed, with only brief interruptions of the cultic activities at times of important political instability.

As members of the royal family and high officials had continued to be buried in the necropolis next to Pepi's pyramid during the reigns of Merenre and Pepi II, including Ankhesenpepi II and III and Pepi's daughter Meritites, Pepi's necropolis had grown and had attracted burials from the highest officials such as vizier Weni. Starting with the reign of Pepi II, the necropolis also attracted burials from private individuals as well as popular devotion to him and his consorts. The deposit of numerous offering tables throughout the site confirms this.

=== Middle Kingdom ===
The conquest of Egypt under Mentuhotep II seems to have interrupted all activities in the necropolis. These resumed towards the end of the Eleventh Dynasty, when the state-sponsored funerary cult of Pepi was renewed, albeit in a more limited form than earlier. At this time, private cultic activities seem to cease in the wider necropolis of Pepi, rather concentrating in Pepi's own mortuary temple, mainly around his statues, then accessible to important officials participating in the pharaoh's cult. Meanwhile, the abandonment of certain parts of the mortuary temple and the queens' necropolis led to the installation of novel tombs. The most prominent of these was that of the high official Reheryshefnakht, who had a small pyramid complex built for himself in the midst of the tombs of the Sixth Dynasty royal family. The royal cult of Pepi I seems to have ended with the onset of the Second Intermediate Period.

=== New Kingdom ===
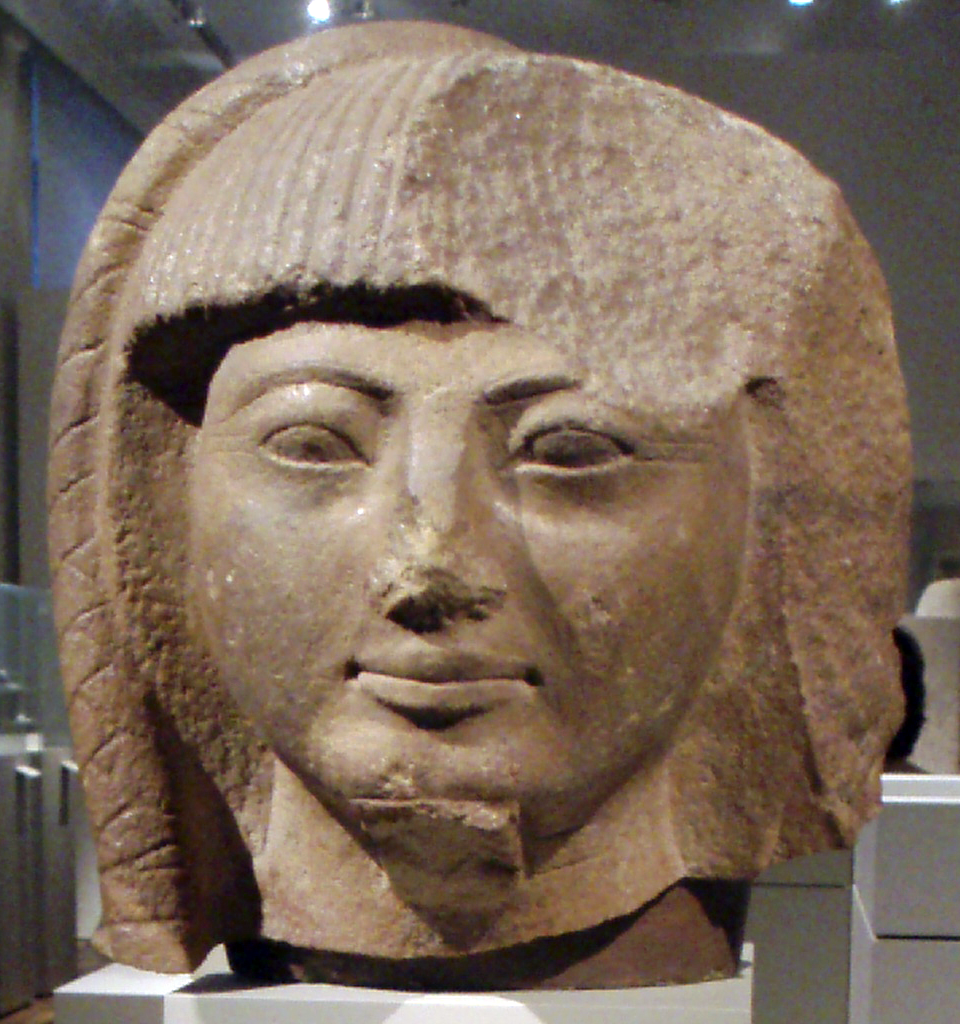
Head of Khaemweset, Altes Museum

The New Kingdom period witnessed renewed private burials in the necropolis of Pepi, including in several rooms of his mortuary temple which were used as a catacomb at the time, although no such tomb was found in the main room hosting the royal funerary cult, suggesting continued use. The individuals buried in the necropolis belonged to the lower ranks of Egyptian society, as shown by the simplicity, if not the absence, of funerary equipment, while those using the catacombs were richer.

The consequences of the long-lasting cults of Old Kingdom pharaohs during the New Kingdom are apparent in the Karnak king list. It was composed during the reign of Thutmosis III to honour a selection of royal ancestors. Several pharaohs of the Fifth and Sixth Dynasty including Nyuserre Ini, Djedkare Isesi, Teti and Pepi I are mentioned on the list by their birth name, rather than throne name. The Egyptologist Antonio Morales believes this is because the popular cults for these kings, which existed well into the New Kingdom, referred to these kings using their birth name.

Later, during the reign of Ramses II, limited restoration works on the Old Kingdom monuments took place in the Memphite area under the direction of Prince Khaemweset. Pepi's pyramid complex was among those restored, as shown by inscriptions left on-site by Khaemweset, even though it was actively being used for private burials. Pepi I's necropolis was, therefore, probably in a ruined state at this point, with the area with the queens' pyramids serving as a stone quarry. Khaemweset stated he had found the pyramid "abandoned" and "recalled his proprietor for posterity". The progressive accumulation of burials in the passages leading up to the temple cult rooms blocked all access to it, demonstrating that Pepi's funerary cult had ceased.

=== Late Period ===
The stone quarrying activities, which were limited to Pepi's necropolis during the New Kingdom and had spared his mortuary temple, became widespread during the Late Period of Egypt, with intermittent burials continuing nonetheless. Both the stone robbing and funerary activities stopped at some point during the period, and the necropolis was abandoned until the Mamluk period when intense stone quarrying resumed.

== Bibliography ==
- Allen, James; Allen, Susan; Anderson, Julie; Arnold, Dieter; Arnold, Dorothea; Cherpion, Nadine; David, Élisabeth; Grimal, Nicolas; Grzymski, Krzysztof; Hawass, Zahi; Hill, Marsha; Jánosi, Peter; Labée-Toutée, Sophie; Labrousse, Audran; Lauer, Jean-Phillippe; Leclant, Jean; Der Manuelian, Peter; Millet, N. B.; Oppenheim, Adela; Craig Patch, Diana; Pischikova, Elena; Rigault, Patricia; Roehrig, Catharine H.; Wildung, Dietrich; Ziegler, Christiane (1999). Egyptian Art in the Age of the Pyramids. New York: The Metropolitan Museum of Art. OCLC 41431623.
- Allen, James (2001). "Pyramid Texts". In Redford, Donald B. (ed.). The Oxford Encyclopedia of Ancient Egypt, Volume 3. Oxford: Oxford University Press. pp. 95–98. ISBN 978-0-19-510234-5.
- Allen, James (2005). Der Manuelian, Peter (ed.). The Ancient Egyptian Pyramid Texts. Writings from the Ancient World, Number 23. Atlanta: Society of Biblical Literature. ISBN 978-1-58983-182-7.
- Altenmüller, Hartwig (2001). "Old Kingdom: Fifth Dynasty". In Redford, Donald B. (ed.). The Oxford Encyclopedia of Ancient Egypt, Volume 2. Oxford: Oxford University Press. pp. 597–601. ISBN 978-0-19-510234-5.
- Amin, Osama Shukir Muhammed (2020). "Jar of Pepi I". World History Encyclopedia.
- Anthes, Rudolf (1928). "Die Felseninschriften von Hatnub nach den Aufnahmen Georg Möllers". Untersuchungen zur Geschichte und Altertumskunde Ägyptens (in German). 9. Leipzig: J. C. Hinrichs.
- Arnold, Dieter (2005). "Royal cult complexes of the Old and Middle Kingdoms". In Schafer, Byron E. (ed.). Temples of Ancient Egypt. London, New York: I. B. Tauris. pp. 31–86. ISBN 978-1-85043-945-5.
- Astour, Michael C. (2002). "A Reconstruction of the History of Ebla (Part 2)". In Gordon, Cyrus H.; Rendsburg, Gary A. (eds.). Eblaitica: Essays on the Ebla Archives and Eblaite Language. Vol. 4. Winona Lake: Eisenbrauns. The Pennsylvania State University Press. ISBN 978-1-57506-060-6.
- Baines, John; Yoffee, Norman (1998). "Order, Legitimacy, and Wealth in Ancient Egypt and Mesopotamia". In Feinman, G.M.; Marcus, J. (eds.). Archaic States. Santa Fe, NM: School of American Research Press. pp. 199–260. OCLC 1119736998.
- Baker, Darrell (2008). The Encyclopedia of the Pharaohs: Volume I - Predynastic to the Twentieth Dynasty 3300 – 1069 BC. London: Stacey International. ISBN 978-1-905299-37-9.
- Bárta, Miroslav (2013). "Egyptian Kingship during the Old Kingdom". In Hill, Jane A.; Jones, Philip; Morales, Antonio J. (eds.). Experiencing Power, Generating Authority. Cosmos, Politics, and the Ideology of Kingship in Ancient Egypt and Mesopotamia. Philadelphia: University of Pennsylvania Museum of Archaeology and Anthropology. pp. 257–283. ISBN 978-1-934536-64-3.
- Bárta, Miroslav (2017). "Radjedef to the Eighth Dynasty". UCLA Encyclopedia of Egyptology.
- Baud, Michel; Dobrev, Vassil (1995). "De nouvelles annales de l'Ancien Empire égyptien. Une "Pierre de Palerme" pour la VIe dynastie". Bulletin de l'Institut Français d'Archéologie Orientale (in French). 95: 23–92. ISSN 0255-0962.
- Baud, Michel (1999a). Famille Royale et pouvoir sous l'Ancien Empire égyptien. Tome 1 (PDF). Bibliothèque d'étude 126/1 (in French). Cairo: Institut français d'archéologie orientale. ISBN 978-2-7247-0250-7. Archived from the original (PDF) on 29 December 2019.
- Baud, Michel (1999b). Famille Royale et pouvoir sous l'Ancien Empire égyptien. Tome 2 (PDF). Bibliothèque d'étude 126/2 (in French). Cairo: Institut français d'archéologie orientale. ISBN 978-2-7247-0250-7. Archived from the original (PDF) on 2 April 2015.
- Baud, Michel (2006). "The Relative Chronology of Dynasties 6 and 8". In Hornung, Erik; Krauss, Rolf; Warburton, David (eds.). Ancient Egyptian Chronology. Handbook of Oriental Studies. Brill Publishers.
- Berger-El Naggar, Catherine (1990). "Le temple de Pépy Ier au Moyen Empire". Saqqara Aux Origines de l'Égypte Pharaonique, Dossiers d'Archéologie (in French). 146. Dijon: Éditions Faton: 90–93.
- Bolshakov, Andrey (2001). "Ka-Chapel". In Redford, Donald B. (ed.). The Oxford Encyclopedia of Ancient Egypt, Volume 2. Oxford: Oxford University Press. pp. 217–219. ISBN 978-0-19-510234-5.
- Bongioanni, Alessandro; Croce, Maria, eds. (2001). The Treasures of Ancient Egypt: From the Egyptian Museum in Cairo. Universe Publishing, a division of Ruzzoli Publications Inc.
- Breasted, James Henry; Brunton, Winifred (1924). Kings and Queens of Ancient Egypt. London: Hodder & Stoughton. OCLC 251195519.
- Brooklyn Museum (2020a). "Vase of Pepi I". Brooklyn Museum.
- Brooklyn Museum (2020b). "Kneeling Statuette of Pepy I". Brooklyn Museum.
- Brooklyn Museum (2020c). "Seated Statuette of Pepy I with Horus Falcon". Brooklyn Museum.
- Brovarski, Edward (1994). "Abydos in the Old Kingdom and First Intermediate Period, Part II". In Silverman, David P. (ed.). For His Ka: Essays Offered in Memory of Klaus Baer. Studies in Ancient Oriental Civilization. Vol. 55. Chicago: The Oriental Institute of the University of Chicago. pp. 15–45. ISBN 0-918986-93-1.
- Bussmann, Richard (2007). "Pepi I and the Temple of Satet at Elephantine". In Mairs, Rachel; Stevenson, Alice (eds.). Current Research in Egyptology 2005. Proceedings of the Sixth Annual Symposium, University of Cambridge, 6-8 January 2005 (PDF). Oxford: Oxbow Books. pp. 16–21. JSTOR j.ctt1cd0npx.
- Callender, Vivienne Gae (1994). "Part III. A prosopographical register of the wives of the Egyptian Kings (Dynasties I–XVII)". The wives of the Egyptian kings: dynasties I–XVII. Macquarie University. School of History, Philosophy, and Politics. OCLC 862671624. Archived from the original on 27 April 2022.
- Cauville, Sylvie (1999). "Dendera". In Bard, Kathryn A.; Blake Shubert, Steven (eds.). Encyclopedia of the Archeology of Ancient Egypt. New York: Routledge. pp. 298–301. ISBN 978-0-203-98283-9.
- Clayton, Peter A. (1994). Chronicle of the Pharaohs. London: Thames & Hudson. ISBN 978-0-500-05074-3.
- Collombert, Philippe (2011). "Découvertes récentes de la mission archéologique française à Saqqâra (campagnes 2007–2011)". Comptes rendus des séances de l'Académie des Inscriptions et Belles-Lettres (in French). 155 (2). persée: 921–938. doi:10.3406/crai.2011.93230.
- Collombert, Philippe (2015a). "Découvertes récentes dans la nécropole de Pépy Ier à Saqqâra" (PDF). Pharaon Magazine (in French). 21. Brétigny sur Orge: Nefer-IT: 10–18. Archived from the original (PDF) on 12 April 2021.
- Collombert, Philippe (2015b). "Le mystérieux vizir Nefer-oun-Méryrê et la nécropole des hauts dignitaires de Pépy Ier à Saqqâra, Egypte" (PDF). Afrique & Orient (in French). 77: 35–44. Archived from the original (PDF) on 12 April 2018.
- Collombert, Philippe (2018). "Recent discoveries of the Mission archéologique franco-suisse de Saqqâra in the funerary complex of queen Ankhnespepy II". Saqqara Newsletter. 16. Leiden: Friends of Saqqara Foundation: 66–75.
- "Cylinder Seal with the Name of Pepi I ca. 2289–2255 B.C." Metropolitan Museum of Art. 19 August 2020.
- Daressy, Georges (1912). "La Pierre de Palerme et la chronologie de l'Ancien Empire". Bulletin de l'Institut Français d'Archéologie Orientale (in French). 12: 161–214. doi:10.3406/bifao.1916.1736. ISSN 0255-0962. S2CID 267263127.
- Daumas, François (1952). "Le trône d'une statuette de Pépi Ier trouvé à Dendara [avec 3 planches]". Bulletin de l'Institut Français d'Archéologie Orientale (in French). 52: 163–172. doi:10.3406/bifao.1953.2108.
- "Découverte de la chambre funéraire de la reine Béhénou". La France en Égypte. Ambassade de France au Caire (in French).
- Dobrev, Vassil; Leclant, Jean (1997). "Nedjeftet. Une nouvelle reine identifiée à Saqqara-Sud". Bulletin de l'Institut Français d'Archéologie Orientale (in French). 97. Le Caire: Institut français d’archéologie orientale: 149–156.
- Dodson, Aidan; Hilton, Dyan (2004). The Complete Royal Families of Ancient Egypt. London: Thames & Hudson. ISBN 978-0-500-05128-3.
- Dreyer, Günter (1986). Elephantine, 8: Der Tempel der Satet. Die Funde der Frühzeit und des Alten Reiches. Archäologische Veröffentlichungen (in German). Vol. 39. Mainz: Philipp von Zabern. ISBN 3-80-530501-X.
- Drioton, Étienne (1947). "Notes diverses. 2, Une corégence de Pépi Ier et de Mérenrê (?)". Annales du service des antiquités de l'Égypte (in French). 45. Cairo: Conseil suprême des Antiquités égyptiennes: 53–92.
- Edwards, Iorwerth Eiddon Stephen (1999). "Dahshur, the Northern Stone Pyramid". In Bard, Kathryn A.; Blake Shubert, Steven (eds.). Encyclopedia of the Archeology of Ancient Egypt. New York: Routledge. pp. 252–254. ISBN 978-0-203-98283-9.
- Eyre, Christopher (1994). "Weni's Career and Old Kingdom Historiography". In Shore, A. F.; Eyre, C.; Leahy, A.; L. M., Leahy (eds.). The unbroken reed: studies in the culture and heritage of Ancient Egypt in honour of A. F. Shore. London: Egypt Exploration Society. pp. 107–124. ISBN 0856981249.
- Eyre, Christopher (2002). The Cannibal Hymn: A Cultural and Literary Study. Liverpool: Liverpool University Press. ISBN 978-0-85323-706-8.
- Fischer, H. G. (1958). "Review of L.Habachi Tell Basta". American Journal of Archaeology. 62. Cairo: Institut Français d’Archeologie Orientale du Caire: 330–333. doi:10.2307/501964. JSTOR 501964.
- Franke, Detlef (1994). Das Heiligtum des Heqaib auf Elephantine. Geschichte eines Provinzheiligtums im Mittleren Reich. Studien zur Archäologie und Geschichte Altägyptens (in German). Vol. 9. Heidelberg: Heidelberger Orientverlag. ISBN 3-92-755217-8.
- Gardiner, Alan (1945). "Regnal Years and Civil Calendar in Pharaonic Egypt". The Journal of Egyptian Archaeology. 31: 11–28. doi:10.1177/030751334503100103. JSTOR 3855380. S2CID 192251888.
- Goedicke, Hans (1954). "An Approximate Date for the Harem Investigation under Pepy I". Journal of the American Oriental Society. 74 (2). American Oriental Society: 88–89. doi:10.2307/596209. JSTOR 596209.
- Goedicke, Hans (1955). "The Abydene Marriage of Pepi I". Journal of the American Oriental Society. 75 (3). Ann Arbor: American Oriental Society: 180–183. doi:10.2307/595170. JSTOR 595170.
- Goedicke, Hans (1963). "The alleged military campaign in southern Palestine in the reign of Pepi I (VIth Dynasty)". Rivista degli studi orientali. 38 (3). Rome: Sapienza Universita di Roma: 187–197. JSTOR 41879487.
- Goedicke, Hans (1988). "The Death of Pepi II-Neferkare". Studien zur Altägyptischen Kultur. 15. Hamburg: Helmut Buske Verlag GmbH: 111–121. JSTOR 44324580.
- Grimal, Nicolas (1992). A History of Ancient Egypt. Translated by Ian Shaw. Oxford: Blackwell Publishing. ISBN 978-0-631-19396-8.
- Gundacker, Roman (2018). "The names of the kings of the Fifth Dynasty according to Manetho's Aegyptiaca". In Kuraszkiewicz, Kamil O.; Kopp, Edyta; Takács, Dániel (eds.). 'The perfection that endures...' Studies on Old Kingdom Art and Archeology. Warsaw: Department of Egyptology - Faculty of Oriental Studies, University of Warsaw. ISBN 978-83-947612-0-2.
- Hays, Harold M. (2012). The Organization of the Pyramid Texts: Typology and Disposition (Volume 1). Probleme der Ägyptologie. Vol. 31. Leiden, Boston: Brill. ISBN 978-90-04-22749-1. ISSN 0169-9601.
- Hayes, William C. (1946). "Royal decrees from the temple of Min at Coptus". Journal of Egyptian Archaeology. 32: 3–23. doi:10.1177/030751334603200102. JSTOR 3855410. S2CID 192279269.
- Hayes, William (1978). The Scepter of Egypt: A Background for the Study of the Egyptian Antiquities in The Metropolitan Museum of Art. Vol. 1, From the Earliest Times to the End of the Middle Kingdom. New York: Metropolitan Museum of Art. OCLC 7427345.
- Heinz, Guido (2002). "Pharoh Pepi I: Documentation of the oldest known life-size metal sculpture using laser scanning and photogrammetry". In Böhler, Wolfgang (ed.). Proceedings of the CIPA WG 6 International Workshop on Scanning for Cultural Heritage Recording. Thessaloniki: ZITI. pp. 127–131. OCLC 931857202.
- Helck, Wolfgang (1971). Die Beziehungen Ägyptens zu Vorderasien im 3. und 2. Jahrtausend v. Chr. Ägyptologische Abhandlungen (in German). Vol. 5 (2nd ed.). Wiesbaden: O. Harrassowitz. ISBN 3-44-701298-6.
- Hellum, Jennifer (2007). The Pyramids. Westport, CT: Greenwood Press. ISBN 9780313325809.
- Hendrickx, Stan (1999). "Elkab". In Bard, Kathryn A.; Blake Shubert, Steven (eds.). Encyclopedia of the Archeology of Ancient Egypt. New York: Routledge. pp. 342–346. ISBN 978-0-203-98283-9.
- Hornung, Erik; Krauss, Rolf; Warburton, David, eds. (2012). Ancient Egyptian Chronology. Handbook of Oriental Studies. Leiden, Boston: Brill. ISBN 978-90-04-11385-5. ISSN 0169-9423.
- Hubschmann, Caroline (2011). "Naguib Kanawati, Conspiracies in the Egyptian Palace: Unis to Pepy I" (PDF). Eras. Melbourne: Monash University.
- Jánosi, Peter (1992). "The Queens of the Old Kingdom and their Tombs". The Bullentin of the Australian Center for Egyptology. 3: 51–57.
- Kaiser, Werner (1999). "Elephantine". In Bard, Kathryn A.; Blake Shubert, Steven (eds.). Encyclopedia of the Archeology of Ancient Egypt. New York: Routledge. pp. 335–342. ISBN 978-0-203-98283-9.
- Kanawati, Naguib (2003). Conspiracies in the Egyptian Palace: Unis to Pepy I. Oxford and New York: Routledge. ISBN 0-415-61937-8.
- Katary, Sally (2001). "Taxation". In Redford, Donald B. (ed.). The Oxford Encyclopedia of Ancient Egypt, Volume 3. Oxford: Oxford University Press. pp. 351–356. ISBN 978-0-19-510234-5.
- Kraemer, Bryan (2017). "A shrine of Pepi I in South Abydos". Journal of Egyptian Archaeology. 103 (1): 13–34. doi:10.1177/0307513317722450. S2CID 191624758.
- Kurth, Angela (1992). "Usurpation, Conquest and Ceremonial: From Babylon to Persia". In Cannadine, David; Price, Simon (eds.). Rituals of Royalty: Power and Ceremonial in Traditional Societies. Cambridge: Cambridge University Press. pp. 20–55. ISBN 9780521428910.
- "La nécropole de Pépy Ier". MAFS, Mission Archéologique Franco-Suisse de Saqqâra (in French). 18 August 2020.
- Lange, Eva (2016). "Die Ka-Anlage Pepis I. in Bubastis im Kontext königlicher Ka-Anlagen des Alten Reiches". Zeitschrift für Ägyptische Sprache und Altertumskunde (in German). 133 (2): 121–140. doi:10.1524/zaes.2006.133.2.121. S2CID 160297448.
- Leclant, Jean (1983). "Fouilles et travaux en Égypte et au Soudan, 1981–1982". Orientalia. Nova Series (in French). 52 (4). Roma: GBP-Gregorian Biblical Press: 461–542. JSTOR 43075253.
- Leclant, Jean; Clerc, Gisèle (1986). "Fouilles et travaux en Égypte et au Soudan, 1984–1985". Orientalia. Nova Series (in French). 55 (3). Roma: GBP-Gregorian Biblical Press: 236–319. JSTOR 43075409.
- Leclant, Jean; Clerc, Gisèle (1994). "Fouilles et travaux en Égypte et au Soudan, 1992–1993". Orientalia. Nova Series (in French). 63 (4). Roma: GBPress- Gregorian Biblical Press: 345–473. JSTOR 43076189.
- Leclant, Jean; Berger-El Naggar, Catherine (1996). "Des confréries religieuses à Saqqara, à la fin de la XIIe dynastie ?". In Der Manuelian, Peter; Freed, R. E. (eds.). Studies in Honor of William Kelly Simpson (PDF) (in French). Vol. 2. Boston: Museum of Fine Arts. pp. 499–506. ISBN 0-87846-390-9.
- Leclant, Jean; Labrousse, Audran (1998). "La nécropole des reines de Pépy Ier à Saqqâra (1988–1998)". Comptes rendus des séances de l'Académie des Inscriptions et Belles-Lettres (in French) (2): 481–491. doi:10.3406/crai.1998.15882.
- Leclant, Jean (1999). "Saqqara, pyramids of the 5th and 6th Dynasties". In Bard, Kathryn A.; Blake Shubert, Steven (eds.). Encyclopedia of the Archeology of Ancient Egypt. New York: Routledge. pp. 865–868. ISBN 978-0-203-98283-9.
- Leclant, Jean; Labrousse, Audran (2006). "Découvertes récentes de la Mission archéologique française à Saqqâra (campagnes 2001–2005)". Comptes rendus des séances de l'Académie des Inscriptions et Belles-Lettres (in French). 1. persée: 103–120. doi:10.3406/crai.2006.86916.
- Legros, Rémi (2016). Stratégies mémorielles. Les cultes funéraires privés en Égypte ancienne de la VIe à la XIIe dynastie. Vol. 70. Lyon: Maison de l'Orient et de la Méditerranée - Jean Pouilloux. ISBN 978-2-35668-058-7.
- Legros, Rémi (2017). "Inhumations privées dans la nécropole de Pépy Ier". In Bárta, Miroslav; Coppens, Filip; Krejčí, Jaromír (eds.). Abusir and Saqqara in the year 2015 (in French). Prague: Faculty of Arts, Charles University. pp. 211–218. ISBN 978-80-7308-758-6.
- Lehner, Mark (1997). The Complete Pyramids. New York: Thames & Hudson. ISBN 978-0-500-28547-3.
- Leprohon, Ronald J. (2013). The Great Name: Ancient Egyptian Royal Titulary. Writings from the ancient world. Vol. 33. Atlanta: Society of Biblical Literature. ISBN 978-1-589-83736-2.
- Málek, Jaromir (2000). "The Old Kingdom (c.2686 – 2160 BC)". In Shaw, Ian (ed.). The Oxford History of Ancient Egypt. Oxford University Press. pp. 104. ISBN 978-0-19-815034-3.
- Marcolin, Michele (2006). "Iny, a much-traveled official of the Sixth Dynasty: unpublished reliefs in Japan". In Bárta, Miroslav; Coppens, Filip; Krejčí, Jaromír (eds.). Abusir and Saqqara in the Year 2005, Proceedings of the Conference held in Prague (June 27 – July 5, 2005). Prague: Academy of Sciences of the Czech Republic, Oriental Institute. pp. 282–310. ISBN 978-80-7308-116-4.
- Matthiae, Paolo (1978). "Recherches archéologiques à Ébla, 1977: le quartier administratif du palais royal G". Comptes rendus des séances de l'Académie des Inscriptions et Belles-Lettres (in French). 122 (2): 204–236.
- Metropolitan Museum of Art (2020). "Cylinder Seal with the Name of Pepi I ca. 2289–2255 B.C." Metropolitan Museum of Art.
- Meyer, Carol (1999). "Wadi Hammamat". In Bard, Kathryn A.; Blake Shubert, Steven (eds.). Encyclopedia of the Archeology of Ancient Egypt. New York: Routledge. pp. 1062–1065. ISBN 978-0-203-98283-9.
- Morales, Antonio J. (2006). "Traces of official and popular veneration to Nyuserra Iny at Abusir. Late Fifth Dynasty to the Middle Kingdom". In Bárta, Miroslav; Coppens, Filip; Krejčí, Jaromír (eds.). Abusir and Saqqara in the Year 2005, Proceedings of the Conference held in Prague (June 27–July 5, 2005). Prague: Academy of Sciences of the Czech Republic, Oriental Institute. pp. 311–341. ISBN 978-80-7308-116-4.
- Moreno García, Juan Carlos (2008). "Estates (Old Kingdom)" (PDF). UCLA Encyclopedia of Egyptology.
- Moreno García, Juan Carlos (2010). "War in Old Kingdom Egypt (2686–2125 BCE)". In Vidal, Jordi (ed.). Studies on War in the Ancient Near East. Collected Essays on Military History. Vol. 372. Münster: Ugarit Verlag. pp. 5–41. ISBN 978-3868350357.
- Moreno García, Juan Carlos (2013). "The Territorial Administration of the Kingdom in the 3rd Millennium". In Moreno García, Juan Carlos (ed.). Ancient Egyptian administration. Leiden, Boston: Brill. pp. 85–152. ISBN 978-90-04-24952-3.
- Moreno García, Juan Carlos (2015). "Climatic change or sociopolitical transformation? Reassessing late 3rd millennium BC in Egypt". 2200 BC: ein Klimasturz als Ursache für den Zerfall der Alten Welt? 7. Mitteldeutscher Archäologentag, vom 23. bis 26. Oktober 2014 in Halle (Saale); 2200 BC: a climatic breakdown as a cause for the collapse of the old world? 7th Archaeological Conference of Central Germany, October 23-26, 2014 in Halle (Saale). Tagungen des Landesmuseums für Vorgeschichte Halle (Saale). Vol. 13. Halle (Saale): Landesamt für Denkmalpflege und Archäologie Sachsen-Anhalt, Landesmuseum für Vorgeschichte. pp. 1–16. ISBN 978-8-44-905585-0.
- Muhly, James (1999). "Metallurgy". In Bard, Kathryn A.; Blake Shubert, Steven (eds.). Encyclopedia of the Archeology of Ancient Egypt. New York: Routledge. pp. 628–634. ISBN 978-0-203-98283-9.
- Murnane, William J. (1977). "Ancient Egyptian Coregencies". Studies in Ancient Oriental Civilization. 40. Chicago: The Oriental Institute.
- O'Connor, David (1992). "The Status of Early Egyptian Temples: An Alternative Theory". In Friedman, Renée; Adams, Barbara (eds.). The Followers of Horus: Studies Dedicated to Michael Allen Hoffman (1944-1990). Oxbow Monograph; Egyptian Studies Association Publication. Vol. 20. Oxford: Oxbow Books. pp. 83–98. OCLC 647981227.
- O'Connor, David (1999). "Abydos, North, ka chapels and cenotaphs". In Bard, Kathryn A.; Blake Shubert, Steven (eds.). Encyclopedia of the Archeology of Ancient Egypt. New York: Routledge. pp. 110–113. ISBN 978-0-203-98283-9.
- Osing, Jürgen (1994). "Zu Spruch 534 der Pyramidentexte". Hommages à Jean Leclant (in German). Vol. 1. Cairo: Institut français d'archéologie orientale. pp. 279–285. ISBN 2-7247-0134-8.
- Pantalacci, Laure (2013). "Balat, A Frontier Town and its Archive". In Moreno García, Juan Carlos (ed.). Ancient Egyptian administration. Leiden, Boston: Brill. pp. 197–214. ISBN 978-90-04-24952-3.
- Peck, William H. (1999). "Sculpture, production techniques". In Bard, Kathryn A.; Blake Shubert, Steven (eds.). Encyclopedia of the Archeology of Ancient Egypt. New York: Routledge. pp. 874–876. ISBN 978-0-203-98283-9.
- "Pepi I king of Egypt". Encyclopædia Britannica. 20 July 1998.
- Petrie, Flinders (1897). A history of Egypt. Volume I: From the earliest times to the XVIth dynasty (Third ed.). London: Methuen & Co. OCLC 265478912.
- Petrie Museum (2020). "Architectural fragments, UC14540". UCL Museums & Collections. Petrie Museum Catalogue.
- Redford, Donald (1992). Egypt, Canaan, and Israel in Ancient Times. Princeton: Princeton University Press. ISBN 978-0-691-03606-9.
- Rice, Michael (1999). Who's Who in Ancient Egypt. Routledge London & New York. ISBN 978-0-203-44328-6.
- Richards, Janet (2002). "Text and Context in late Old Kingdom Egypt: The Archaeology and Historiography of Weni the Elder". Journal of the American Research Center in Egypt. 39. American Research Center in Egypt: 75–102. doi:10.2307/40001150. JSTOR 40001150.
- Ryholt, Kim (1997). The Political Situation in Egypt during the Second Intermediate Period c. 1800–1550 B.C. CNI publications. Vol. 20. Copenhagen: The Carsten Niebuhr Institute of Near Eastern Studies: Museum Tusculam Press. ISBN 87-7289-421-0.
- Schulman, Alan (1999). "Army". In Bard, Kathryn A.; Blake Shubert, Steven (eds.). Encyclopedia of the Archeology of Ancient Egypt. New York: Routledge. pp. 165–167. ISBN 978-0-203-98283-9.
- Smith, William Stevenson (1971). "The Old Kingdom of Egypt and the Beginning of the First Intermediate Period". In Edwards, I. E. S.; Gadd, C. J.; Hammond, N. G. L. (eds.). The Cambridge Ancient History, Volume 1, Part 2. Early History of the Middle East (3rd ed.). London, New york: Cambridge University Press. pp. 145–207. ISBN 9780521077910. OCLC 33234410.
- Smith, Mark (1999). "Gebel el-Silsila". In Bard, Kathryn A.; Blake Shubert, Steven (eds.). Encyclopedia of the Archeology of Ancient Egypt. New York: Routledge. pp. 394–397. ISBN 978-0-203-98283-9.
- Sowada, Karin N. (2009). Egypt in the Eastern Mediterranean During the Old Kingdom: An Archaeological Perspective (PDF). Orbis Biblicus Et Orientalis. Vol. 237. Fribourg, Göttingen: Academic Press, Vandenhoeck & Ruprecht. ISBN 978-3525534557.
- Spalinger, Anthony (1994). "Dated Texts of the Old Kingdom". Studien zur Altägyptischen Kultur. 21. Hamburg: Helmut Buske Verlag GmbH: 275–319. JSTOR 25152700.
- Spalinger, Anthony (2013). "The Organisation of the Pharaonic Army (Old to New Kingdom)". In Moreno García, Juan Carlos (ed.). Ancient Egyptian administration. Leiden, Boston: Brill. pp. 393–478. ISBN 978-90-04-24952-3.
- Stevenson, Alice (2015). "Pyramids in the Petrie". In Stevenson, Alice (ed.). Petrie Museum of Egyptian Archaeology: Characters and Collections. London: UCL Press. pp. 48–51. doi:10.2307/j.ctt1g69z2n. ISBN 9781910634356. JSTOR j.ctt1g69z2n.
- Strudwick, Nigel C. (2005). Texts from the Pyramid Age. Writings from the Ancient World (book 16). Atlanta: Society of Biblical Literature. ISBN 978-1-58983-680-8.
- Tallet, Pierre (2015). Argémi, Bruno; Tallet, Pierre (eds.). "Les "ports intermittents" de la mer Rouge à l'époque pharaonique : caractéristiques et chronologie". Nehet, revue numérique d'égyptologie (in French). 3. Paris-Sorbonne - Université Libre de Bruxelles: 31–72.
- "Textes des Pyramides". MAFS, Mission Archéologique Franco-Suisse de Saqqâra (in French). 18 August 2020.
- Tiradritti, Francesco; de Luca, Araldo (1999). Egyptian Treasures from the Egyptian Museum in Cairo. New York: Harry Abrams. ISBN 978-0810932760.
- Tyldesley, Joyce (2019). The pharaohs. London: Quercus. ISBN 978-1-52-940451-7.
- Verner, Miroslav (1994). Forgotten Pharaohs, Lost Pyramids: Abusir (PDF). Prague: Academia Škodaexport. ISBN 978-80-200-0022-4. Archived from the original (PDF) on 1 February 2011.
- Verner, Miroslav (2001a). "Archaeological Remarks on the 4th and 5th Dynasty Chronology" (PDF). Archiv Orientální. 69 (3): 363–418. Archived from the original (PDF) on 4 March 2016.
- Verner, Miroslav (2001b). "Old Kingdom". In Redford, Donald B. (ed.). The Oxford Encyclopedia of Ancient Egypt, Volume 2. Oxford: Oxford University Press. pp. 585–591. ISBN 978-0-19-510234-5.
- Verner, Miroslav (2001c). The Pyramids: The Mystery, Culture and Science of Egypt's Great Monuments. New York: Grove Press. ISBN 978-0-8021-1703-8.
- Verner, Miroslav (2002). The Pyramids: the mystery, culture, and science of Egypt's great monuments. New York: Grove Press. ISBN 978-0-80-219863-1.
- von Beckerath, Jürgen (1997). Chronologie des pharaonischen Ägypten : die Zeitbestimmung der ägyptischen Geschichte von der Vorzeit bis 332 v. Chr. Münchner ägyptologische Studien (in German). Vol. 46. Mainz am Rhein: Philipp von Zabern. ISBN 978-3-8053-2310-9.
- von Beckerath, Jürgen (1999). Handbuch der ägyptischen Königsnamen. Münchner ägyptologische Studien (in German). Mainz: Philip von Zabern. ISBN 978-3-8053-2591-2.
- Waddell, William Gillan (1971). Manetho. Loeb Classical Library, 350. Cambridge, Massachusetts; London: Harvard University Press; W. Heinemann. OCLC 6246102.
- Walters Art Museum (2020). "Jubilee Vessel of Pepi I".
- Warburton, David (2012). Architecture, power, and religion : Hatshepsut, Amun & Karnak in context. Beiträge zur Archäologie. Vol. 7. Münster: Lit Verlag GmbH. ISBN 978-3-64-390235-1.
- "Weny Fragment". Rosicrucian Egyptian Museum. 2020.
- Wilkinson, Richard H. (2000). The Complete Temples of Ancient Egypt. New York: Thames & Hudson. ISBN 978-0-500-05100-9.
- Wright, Mary; Pardee, Dennis (1988). "Literary Sources for the History of Palestine and Syria: Contacts between Egypt and Syro-Palestine during the Old Kingdom". The Biblical Archaeologist. 51 (3). Chicago: The University of Chicago Press on behalf of The American Schools of Oriental Research: 143–161. doi:10.2307/3210065. JSTOR 3210065. S2CID 163985913.
- Yurco, Frank J. (1999). "Cult temples prior to the New Kingdom". In Bard, Kathryn A.; Blake Shubert, Steven (eds.). Encyclopedia of the Archeology of Ancient Egypt. New York: Routledge. pp. 239–242. ISBN 978-0-203-98283-9.
