= Inenek-Inti =

Egyptian queen consort

Inenek
in n n k

Queen consort of Egypt
- Tenure: c. 2310 BC
- King: Pepi I
- Burial: Badrshein, Giza, Egypt
- Spouse: Pepi I
- Dynasty: 6th Dynasty

Inenek, also called Inti (fl. c. 2310 BC), was an ancient Egyptian queen consort, a wife of King Pepi I of the 6th Dynasty.

== Titles ==
Inti's titles were: Hereditary Princess (iryt-p`t), Foremost of the Elite (ḥ`tit-p`t), King's Wife (hmt-niswt), King's Wife, his beloved (ḥmt-niswt mryt.f), Daughter of Merehu (z3t-Mrḥw), and Daughter of Geb (z3t-Gb).

== Burial ==
Inenek-Inti was buried in a pyramid at Saqqara. Her pyramid is part of the pyramid complex of her husband Pepi I. Her complex is located just west of that of Queen Nubwenet. Inenek-Inti may have been slightly more important than Nubwenet as her pyramid and mortuary temple are slightly larger than those of Nubwenet's. Inenek-Inti's complex is surrounded by a perimeter wall. Her mortuary temple was built so that the building wound around a corner. The mortuary temple included a small pillared hall and an open courtyard which featured several offering tables.
