= Nubwenet =

nbw wn&n&t O31

Queen consort of Egypt
- King: Pepi I
- Burial: pyramid at Saqqara
- Spouse: Pepi I
- Religion: Ancient Egyptian religion

Nubwenet (sometimes written as Nebuunet) was an ancient Egyptian queen consort, a wife of Pharaoh Pepi I of the 6th dynasty.

== Titles ==
Her titles were: Great one of the hetes-sceptre (wrt-ḥts), She who sees Horus and Seth (m33t-ḥrw-stš), Great of Praises (wrt-hzwt), King's Wife, his beloved (hmt-niswt mryt.f), Beloved King's Wife of Pepi-Mennefer (ḥmt-niswt-nt-ppy-mn-nfr-mryt.f), and Companion of Horus (smrt-ḥrw).

== Tomb ==
Nubwenet is buried in a pyramid which is associated with the pyramid complex of Pepi I at Saqqara. Nebwenet's pyramid complex lies at the far Eastern part of Pepi I's pyramid complex. Nebwenet had a small pyramid (the sides were about 21 m long and the pyramid was about 21 m high) and a small mortuary complex, which is now mostly destroyed. The pyramid was made from limestone, while the temple was constructed from mudbrick.
