= Ankhesenpepi =

< p p i i > S34 n Aa1 n s
Ankhesenpepi
in hieroglyphs
Era: Old Kingdom
(2686–2181 BC)

Ankhesenpepi (Ankhesenpepy, Ankhenespepi, Ankhenespepy) was the name of four queen consorts during the sixth dynasty of Egypt. The name means "Her life belongs to Pepi". Two of them were married to Pharaoh Pepi I (whose throne name was Meryre; these two ladies were also known as Ankhesenmeryre), the other two were married to Pharaoh Pepi II.

== Old Kingdom, royalties ==
- Ankhesenpepi I, wife of Pepi I, mother of Merenre Nemtyemsaf
- Ankhesenpepi II, wife of Pepi I, mother of Pepi II
- Ankhesenpepi III, daughter of Merenre I, wife of Pepi II
- Ankhesenpepi IV, wife of Pepi II, possible mother of a prince Neferkara

== First Intermediate Period, Non-Royal ==
- Ankhesenpepi, Royal Ornament, Daughter of the Overlords of Upper Egypt, One Revered with Hathor, Mistress of Denderah. Stele from Naga ed-Der.
