= Merenre Nemtyemsaf I =

23rd-century BC Egyptian pharaoh

- Mernere; Ra-mer-en; Antyemsaf; Mentusuphis; Μεθουσοῦφις
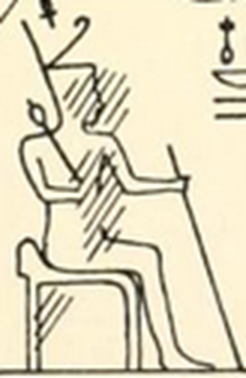
- Image of Merenre Nemtyemsaf I found at Hatnub

Pharaoh
- Reign: 6–7 or 9–11 years in the early 23rd century BC. (Note: List of dates proposed for Merenre's reign: 2361–2355 BC, 2310–2300 BC, 2287–2278 BC, 2285–2279 BC, 2283–2278 BC, 2283–2269 BC, 2263–2257 BC, 2260–2254 BC, 2255–2246 BC, 2252–2242 BC, 2235–2229 BC, 2227–2217 BC, 2219–2212 BC.)
- Coregency: uncertain, possibly with his father Pepi I, less likely with his successor Pepi II
- Predecessor: Pepi I Meryre
- Successor: Pepi II Neferkare
Royal titulary
Horus name
Ankh Khau
ꜥnḫ-ḫꜣw
Horus, whose appearances are (very much) alive
| G5 | anx xa w |
Nebty name
Ankh Khau Nebty
ꜥnḫ-ḫꜣw nbty
(The one for whom) the appearances of the two ladies are alive
| G16 | anx xa w |
Golden Horus
Bikwi Nebu
bjkwy nbw
The golden double falcon
| G8 | G5 G5 nbw |
Prenomen
Merenre
mr.n rꜥ
The one whom Re has loved

| M23 X1 L2 X1 | ra mr r n |
Nomen
Nemty em za ef
nmty m zꜣ.f
(The god) Nemty is his protection
Nemty is his protection

| G39 N5 | G7A m V17 f |
- Consorts: Ankhesenpepi II (aunt and stepmother)
- Children: Ankhesenpepi III ♀ Iput II♀ Uncertain: Pepi II Neferkare♂
- Father: Pepi I Meryre
- Mother: Ankhesenpepi I
- Burial: Pyramid of Merenre in Saqqara
- Monuments: Pyramid complex Khanefermerenre; Possibly a Ka-chapel in Abydos; Renewal of a granite shrine in the temple of Satet on Elephantine island; Canal dug near the First Cataract
- Dynasty: Sixth Dynasty

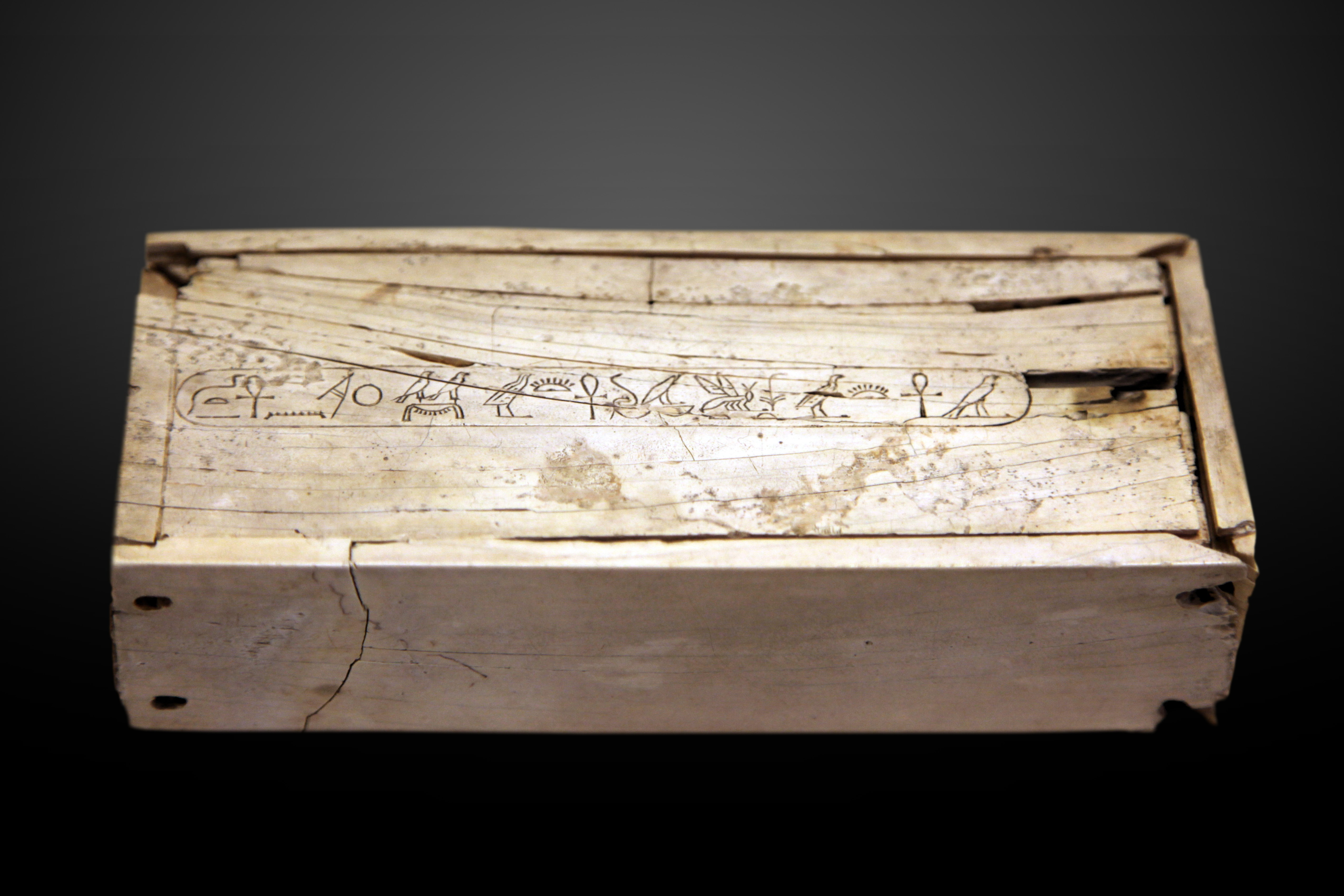
A small box of hippopotamus ivory inscribed with the royal titulary of Merenre Nemtyemsaf, Musée du Louvre (Note: The box, inventory N. 794, is inscribed with, on the lid: "Horus Ankhkhau, the king of Upper and Lower Egypt, the Two Ladies Ankhkhau, the double Golden Horus, Merenre, may he live for ever" and on the front of the box: "Horus Ankhkhau. The king of Upper and Lower Egypt Merenre. The Two Ladies Ankhkhau. Given life for ever". The box might originate from Thebes and might have originally been part of the funerary equipment of a provincial official.)

Merenre Nemtyemsaf (meaning 'Beloved of Ra, Nemty is his protection') was an Ancient Egyptian pharaoh and the fourth king of the Sixth Dynasty. He ruled Egypt for six to eleven years in the early 23rd century BC, toward the end of the Old Kingdom period. He was the son of Pepi I Meryre and queen Ankhesenpepi I and was in turn succeeded by Pepi II Neferkare, who might have been his son or, less probably, his brother. Pepi I may have shared power with Merenre in a co-regency at the very end of the former's reign.

Merenre's rule saw profound changes in the administration of the southern provinces of Egypt, with a marked increase in the number of provincial administrators and a concurrent steep decline in the size of the central administration in the capital Memphis. As a consequence, the provincial nobility became responsible for tax collection and resource management, gaining in political independence and economic power. This led to the first provincial burials for the highest officials, including viziers, governors of Upper Egypt, and nomarchs.

Several trading and quarrying expeditions took place under Merenre, in particular to Nubia, where caravans of hundreds of donkeys were sent to fetch incense, ebony, animal skins, ivory and exotic animals. Such was the interest in the region that Merenre had a canal dug to facilitate the navigation of the first cataract into Nubia. Trade with the Levantine coast for lapis lazuli, silver, bitumen, and tin took place while quarrying for granite, travertine and alabaster took place in the south and in the Eastern Desert.

A pyramid complex was built for Merenre in Saqqara, known as Khanefermerenre by the Ancient Egyptians meaning 'the appearance of the perfection of Merenre' and likely completed prior to the king's death. The subterranean chambers were inscribed with the Pyramid Texts. In the burial chamber, the black basalt sarcophagus of the king still held a mummy when it was entered in the 19th century. The identification of the mummy as Merenre's is still uncertain. Following his death, Merenre was the object of a funerary cult until at least the end of the Old Kingdom. During the New Kingdom period, he was in a selection of past kings to be honoured.

== Family ==
=== Parents and siblings ===
Merenre was the son of king Pepi I Meryre and queen Ankhesenpepi I, also called Ankhesenmeryre. Pepi I probably begot him in his old age. Ankhesenpepi's motherhood is indicated by her titles. She bore the title of "mother of the king of Upper and Lower Egypt of the pyramid of Merenre" in tomb inscriptions, a style which at the time indicated relation to the king. Ankhesenpepi was a daughter of the nomarch of Abydos, Khui, and his wife Nebet. Pepi I made her into a vizier, the sole woman of the Old Kingdom period known to have held such a title. Khui and Nebet's son, Merenre's uncle Djau, served in the position of vizier under Merenre and Pepi II Neferkare.

Princess Neith was Merenre's full sister. The archaeologist Gustave Jéquier has proposed that Neith was first married to Merenre then to Pepi II, explaining the absence of her tomb near that of Merenre as would be expected of a royal spouse. The Egyptologist Vivienne Callender observes however that among Neith's titles presented in her tomb, those referring to her relation to Merenre are now illegible. Consequently, Callender states that whether or not she was married to Merenre cannot be ascertained beyond doubt.

Probable children of Pepi I who might thus be at least half-siblings of Merenre include princes Hornetjerkhet and Tetiankh and princess Meritites IV.

=== Consorts and children ===
Sixth dynasty royal seals and stone blocks found at Saqqara demonstrate that Merenre's aunt Ankhesenpepi II, (Note: Ankhesenpepi II was either the full sister of the half sister of Ankhesenpepi I.) who married Pepi I, was also married to Merenre. She was the mother of the future pharaoh Pepi II. This is shown by her titles of "royal wife of the pyramid of Meryre", "Royal wife of the pyramid of Merenre" and "royal mother of the pyramid of Neferkare [Pepi II]".

Many Egyptologists favour Pepi I as the father of Pepi II. But the Egyptologist Philippe Collombert observes that since historical sources agree that Merenre's reign intervened between those of Pepi I and Pepi II and lasted for around a decade, and given that one source states that Pepi II acceded to the throne at the age of six, then this indirectly indicates that Merenre I, rather than Pepi I, was Pepi II's father. This opinion is shared by the Egyptologists Naguib Kanawati and Peter Brand.

Merenre had at least one daughter, Ankhesenpepi III, who became the wife of Pepi II. Merenre could also be the father of queen Iput II, another wife of Pepi II.

== Reign ==
=== Attestations ===
Merenre is well attested by archaeology not only through his pyramid complex, but also through inscriptions and small artefacts bearing his name. These include

- an alabaster vessel (inventory E 23140b) and ivory box (inventory N. 794), both in the Louvre Museum
- a small sphinx in the National Museum of Scotland (inventory 1984.405)
- another sphinx in the Pushkin Museum
- a calcite vessel in shape of a mother monkey and her child in the Metropolitan Museum of Art
- a vase (inventory EA4493), a box (inventory EA65848) and a fragment of tomb painting (inventory EA65927), all in the British Museum
- an alabaster vase (inventory no.3252) in the National Archaeological Museum, Florence
- a similar vessel from Elephantine that was in the Egyptian Museum in Cairo (inventory CG 18694) in 1907

=== Chronology ===
==== Relative ====
The relative chronological position of Merenre Nemtyemsaf I within the Sixth Dynasty is certain. Historical sources and archaeological evidences agree that he succeeded Pepi I Meryre on the throne and was in turn succeeded by Pepi II Neferkare, evidencing that he was the fourth king of the dynasty.

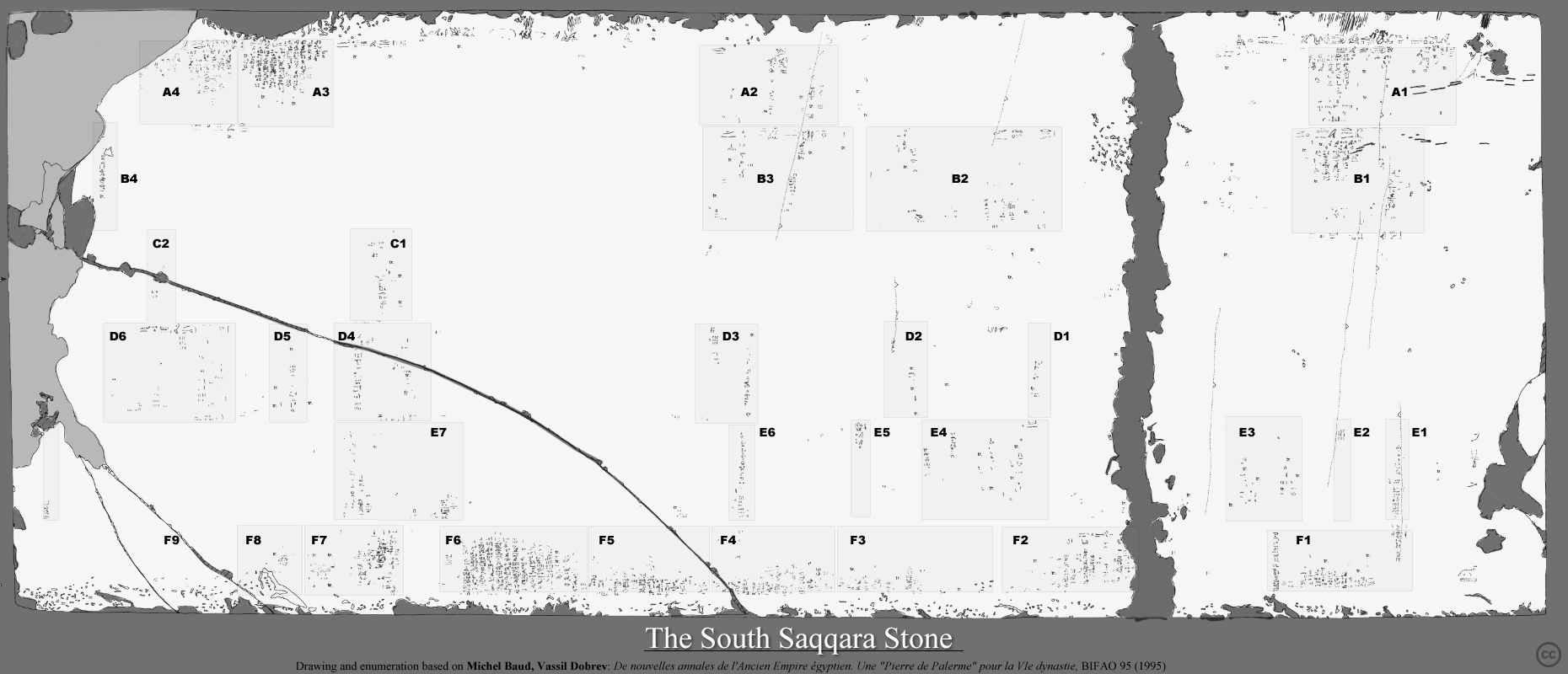
The South Saqqara Stone, the royal annals of the Sixth Dynasty, with register F at the bottom pertaining to Merenre's reign

The earliest historical source on the matter is the South Saqqara Stone, a royal annal inscribed during the reign of either Merenre or Pepi II. An estimated 92% of the text inscribed on the stone was lost when it was roughly polished to be reused as a sarcophagus lid, possibly in the late First Intermediate (c. 2160 – c. 2055 BC) to early Middle Kingdom period (c. 2055 – c. 1650 BC). Nonetheless the few legible text fragments of the annal support the succession "Teti → Userkare → Pepi I → Merenre I" possibly followed by Pepi II, making Merenre the fourth king of the Sixth Dynasty.

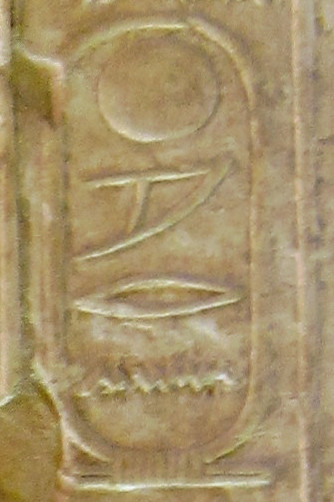
Merenre's cartouche on the Abydos King List

Three more historical sources agree with this chronology, (Note: In addition to these sources, Merenre's cartouche is also present on the Karnak King List composed during the reign of Thutmosis III (c. 1479–1425 BC). The list was meant to present a selection of past kings that were to receive a cult. In particular, the kings are given out of chronological order and therefore Merenre's relative position within the Sixth Dynasty cannot be ascertained from this source.) three of which date to the New Kingdom period. The Abydos King List, written under Seti I (fl. c. 1290 BC) places Merenre I's cartouche as the 37th entry between those of Pepi I and Pepi II. The Turin Canon, a list of kings on papyrus dating to the reign of Ramses II (fl. c. 1250 BC) probably records Merenre I in the fifth column, fourth row, (Note: This corresponds to the fourth column, fourth row in Gardiner's reading of the canon.) and may have supported his relative position within the dynasty although his name as well as those of his predecessor and successor is illegible. If the attribution of the entry is correct, then Merenre is credited with a reign length ending with the number four, perhaps some years and four months, or four or 14 years. Also dating to the reign of Ramses II is the Saqqara Tablet, explicitly relating the succession "Pepi I → Merenre I → Pepi II", with Merenre located on the 24th entry. (Note: Also reported as 35th entry depending on the reading order for the entries.)

The latest historical source recording a similar information is the Aegyptiaca (Αἰγυπτιακά), a history of Egypt written in the third century BC during the reign of Ptolemy II (283–246 BC) by the priest-historian Manetho. No copies of the Aegyptiaca have survived and it is now known only through later writings by Sextus Julius Africanus and Eusebius. According to the Byzantine scholar George Syncellus, Africanus wrote that the Aegyptiaca mentioned the succession "Othoês → Phius → Methusuphis → Phiops" at the beginning of the Sixth Dynasty. Othoês, Phius, Methusuphis (in Greek, Μεθουσοῦφις) and Phiops are believed to be the Hellenised forms for Teti, Pepi I, Merenre and Pepi II, respectively. The Aegyptiaca credits Methusuphis with seven years of reign.

==== Absolute ====
Merenre's reign is difficult to date precisely in absolute terms. An absolute chronology referring to dates in our modern calendar is estimated by Egyptologists working backwards by adding reign lengths—themselves uncertain and inferred from historical sources and archaeological evidence—and, in a few cases, using ancient astronomical observations and radiocarbon dating. These methodologies do not agree perfectly and some uncertainty remains. As a result, Merenre's rule is generally dated to the early 23rd century BC. Various hypotheses have been proposed by scholars though it is impossible to determine which one is right.

=== Duration ===
During the Old Kingdom period, Ancient Egyptians dated their documents and inscriptions by counting the years since the accession of the current king to the throne. These years were often referred to by the number of cattle counts which had taken place since the reign's start. The cattle count, which involved counting cattle, oxen and small livestock, was an important event aimed at evaluating the amount of taxes to be levied on the population. During the early Sixth Dynasty this count was perhaps biennial, occurring every two years. The latest surviving inscription written during Merenre's rule is located in a quarry at Hatnub mentioning the year after the 5th cattle count. If the cattle count was regular and purely biennial, this might correspond to Merenre's tenth year on the throne. Similarly, for Baud and Dobrev a regular biennial count implies that the South Saqqara Stone recorded at least 11 to 13 years of reign for Merenre, almost twice the figure of seven years attributed to him in the Aegyptiaca. For Baud such a reign length is consistent with the finished state of Merenre's pyramid complex.

In 1959, the Egyptologist and philologist Alan Gardiner proposed reading a now discounted 44 years figure on the Turin canon for Merenre, which the Egyptologist and art historian William Stevenson Smith later took to be 14 years instead, of which he attributes nine to a co-regency between Merenre and Pepi I. The Egyptologist Elmar Edel thought such lengths of reign would explain the time necessary for the peaceful relations that Egypt entertained with Lower Nubian chiefs under Merenre to switch to more adversarial ones under Pepi II. In contrast, because of doubts on the regularity of the cattle count and of the general paucity of monuments and documents datable to his reign, Merenre is often credited with less than a decade on the throne by most modern Egyptologists: some (Note: Shaw and Nicholson, Verner, Allen, Altenmüller, Málek, Sowada, Rice, Krauss, Lehner, and Hornung.) give him nine to eleven years; while others (Note: Baer, Spalinger, Beckerath, Wright and Pardee, Clayton, Brovarski, Dodson and Hilton, Strudwick, and Baker.) propose six or seven years of reign.

=== Accession to the throne: co-regency ===
Merenre's father Pepi's rule seems to have been troubled at times, with at least one conspiracy against him hatched by one of his harem consorts. This may have given him the impetus to ally himself with Khui, the nomarch of Coptos, by marrying his daughters, queens Ankhesenpepi I and II. The Egyptologist Naguib Kanawati conjectures that Pepi faced another conspiracy toward the end of his reign, in which his vizier Rawer may have been involved. To support his theory, Kanawati observes that Rawer's image in his tomb has been desecrated, with his name, hands and feet chiselled off, while this same tomb is dated to the second half of Pepi's reign on stylistic grounds. Kanawati further posits that the conspiracy may have aimed at having someone else made heir to the throne at the expense of the designated heir Merenre. Because of this failed conspiracy, Pepi I may have taken the drastic (Note: The drastic nature of Pepi's decision—if there was a co-regency—is apparent on noting the Ancient Egyptians conception of the kingship as "rulership by a single individual holding a supreme office in a lifelong tenure, most often succeeding on a hereditary principle and wielding [...] great personal power". The emphasis on a single individual holder follows from the Ancient Egyptians' perception of the king as having an exclusive relationship with the gods, controlling religious benefits and owning the whole of Egypt. The king, as a divine being, offspring of Ra, who upholds Egypt's unity and prosperity as well as the cosmic order preordained by the gods and plays the crucial role of mediator between the people and the gods, with the capacity of conveying the gods' messages and will. The king not only had these unique roles but the institution of kingship was perceived as a divinely established order guarding Egypt against chaos.) step of crowning Merenre during his own reign, possibly "in an attempt to secure stability and continuity within the family" as Miroslav Bárta writes; thereby creating the earliest documented co-regency in the history of Egypt. The Egyptologists Jaromir Málek and Miroslav Verner agree with this analysis; Verner adds that Merenre acceded to the throne at an early age and died young.

That such a co-regency took place was first proposed by Étienne Drioton who pointed to a gold pendant bearing the names of both Pepi I and Merenre I as living kings, implying that both ruled concurrently for some time. In support of this hypothesis, the Egyptologist Hans Goedicke mentions the inscription dated to Merenre's year of the fifth cattle count from Hatnub which he takes to indicate ten years of rule hence contradicting Manetho's figure of seven years. This could be evidence that Merenre dated the start of his reign before the end of his father's reign, as a co-regency would permit.

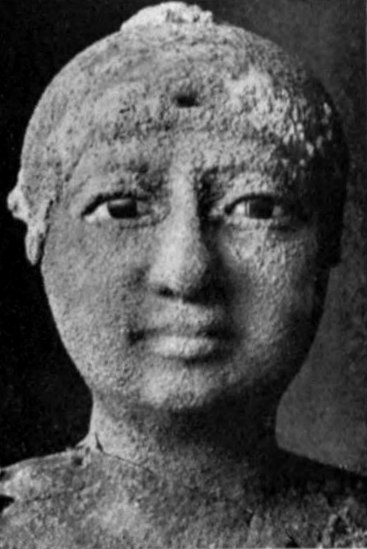
The smaller copper statue from Hierakonpolis, representing Merenre or a young Pepi I

A possible further piece of evidence for a co-regency is given by two copper statues uncovered in an underground store beneath the floor of a Ka-chapel of Pepi in Hierakonpolis. There the Egyptologist James Quibell uncovered a statue of King Khasekhemwy of the Second Dynasty, a terracotta lion cub made during the Thinite era, a golden mask representing Horus and two copper statues. Originally fashioned by hammering plates of copper over a wooden base, these statues had been disassembled, placed inside one another and then sealed with a thin layer of engraved copper bearing the titles and names of Pepi I "on the first day of the Sed festival". The two statues were symbolically "trampling underfoot the Nine bows"—the enemies of Egypt—a stylized representation of Egypt's conquered foreign subjects. While the identity of the larger adult figure as Pepi I is revealed by the inscription, the identity of the smaller statue showing a younger person remains unresolved. The most common hypothesis among Egyptologists is that the young man shown is Merenre. As Alessandro Bongioanni and Maria Croce write: "[Merenre] was publicly associated as his father's successor on the occasion of the Jubilee [the Sed festival]. The placement of his copper effigy inside that of his father would therefore reflect the continuity of the royal succession and the passage of the royal sceptre from father to son before the death of the pharaoh could cause a dynastic split." Alternatively, Bongioanni and Croce have also proposed the smaller statue may represent "a more youthful Pepi I, reinvigorated by the celebration of the Jubilee ceremonies".

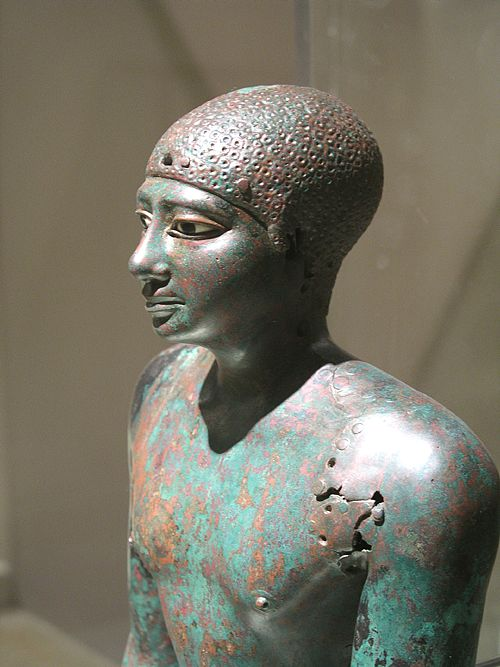
The smaller copper statue from Hierakonpolis, representing Merenre or a young Pepi I

The existence of the co-regency remains uncertain, lacking any definite proof. For Vassil Dobrev and Michel Baud, who analysed the royal annals of the South Saqqara Stone, Merenre directly succeeded his father in power. In particular, the legible parts of the annals bear with no traces in direct support of an interregnum or co-regency. More precisely, the document preserves the record of Pepi I's final year and proceeds immediately to the first year of Merenre. Furthermore, the shape and size of the stone on which the annals are inscribed makes it more probable that Merenre did not start to count his years of reign until soon after the death of his father. Furthermore, William J. Murnane writes that the gold pendant's context is unknown, making its significance regarding the co-regency difficult to appraise. The copper statues are similarly inconclusive as the identity of the smaller one, and whether they originally formed a group, remains uncertain.

=== Domestic activities ===
==== Administration ====
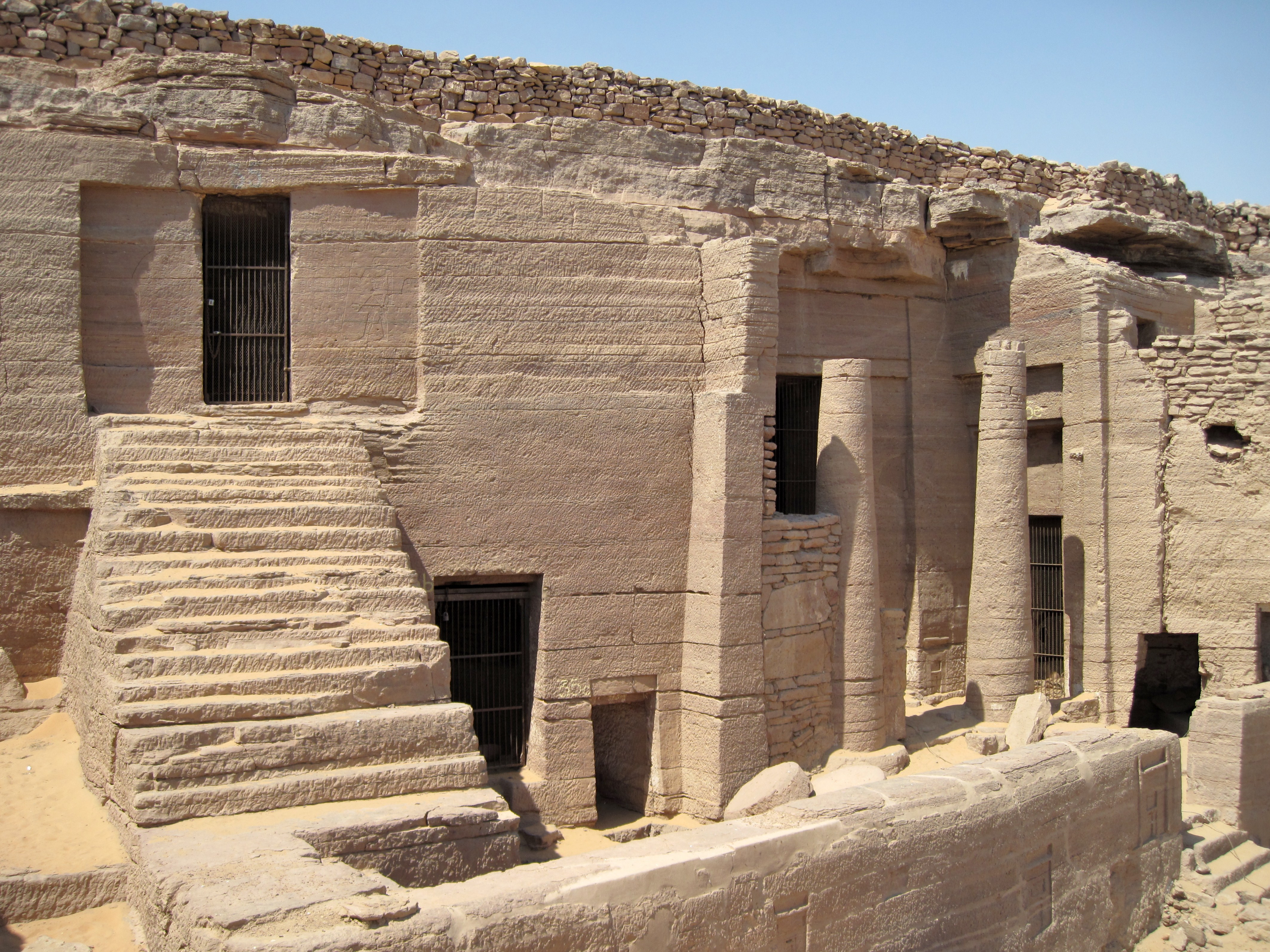
Provincial tomb of Heqaib near Aswan

Developments of the provincial administration were undertaken during Merenre's rule, with a marked increase in the number of provincial administrators including newly created titles for granary and treasury overseers, paralleled with a steep decline in the size of the central administration in Memphis. For the Egyptologists Nigel Strudwick and Petra Andrassy this witnesses to an incessantly evolving domestic policy aimed at managing the remote southern provinces. The motivations behind such changes are not clear. Either an attempt was made at improving the provincial administration or the goal was to disperse powerful nobles throughout the realm, away from the royal court. Indeed, the many marriages of Pepi I may have generated instability by creating competing groups and factions at court. In any case, the reforms appear to have been implemented rather uniformly, suggesting that the central executive authority of the state was still substantial at that time.

With these changes, provincial officials were now directly responsible for the collection of local tax and labour and dealt with all works in their nomes from then on. The increasing political and economic importance of individual nomes and local centres is reflected in that even the highest ranking officials including the viziers and the overseers of Upper Egypt started to be abundantly buried in the provinces rather than close to the royal necropolis. For example, the nomarch of the second nome Qar was buried in Edfu, nomarchs Harkhuf and later Heqaib in Qubbet el-Hawa near Aswan, vizier Idi near modern-day Asyut and vizier Weni in the eighth nome at Abydos. More provincial burials of Upper Egyptian nomarchs from this time period have been uncovered in Elephantine, Thebes (fourth nome), Coptos (fifth nome), Dendera (sixth nome), Qasr el-Sayed (seventh nome), Akhmim (ninth nome), Deir el-Gabrawi (12th nome), Meir (14th nome), El Sheikh Sa'id (15th nome), Zawyet el-Maiyitin (16th nome), Kom el-Ahmar (18th nome), Deshasha (20th nome) and Balat in the Dakhla Oasis. These rock-cut tombs are markedly different from the mastabas of the royal necropolises. At the same time, Pepi I, Merenre and Pepi II deliberately set up cults for queens Ankhesenpepi I, Ankhesenpepi II and later Iput II in the Qift province, whence they originated. Richard Bußmann says this was an effort to "strengthen the kings' ties to powerful families in Upper Egypt".

At the personal level, Merenre may have appointed Idi, possibly a relative of Djau, to the courtly rank of sole companion of the king and nomarch of the Upper Egyptian eighth nome. Idi later served Pepi II in the 12th nome. Another administrative official whom Merenre promoted was Weni. He was made leader of quarrying expeditions then a count and governor of Upper Egypt. In this role Weni organised two censuses and two corvées in the South on behalf of the court. Weni was then elevated to the highest offices, those of vizier and chief judge, and likely died during Merenre's reign. Merenre appointed Qar nomarch of Edfu and overseer of Upper Egyptian grain and livestock resources. He was also appointed chief judge over the whole of Upper Egypt. Merenre also made Kaihap Tjeti, a provincial-born young royal courtier under Pepi I, into a stolist of the god Min. Kaihap Tjeti later became nomarch of the ninth Upper Egyptian nome under Merenre or Pepi II, and was buried near Akhmim.

==== Cultic activities ====
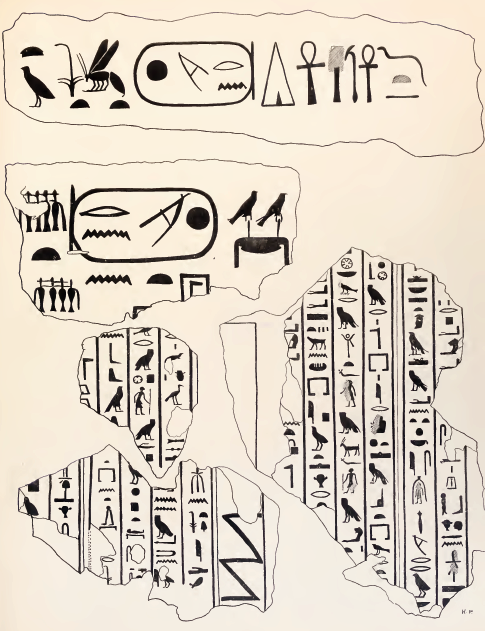
Fragments of private stele bearing Merenre's cartouche from Kom el-Sultan

Religious activities dating to Merenre's reign are recorded on the legible passages of the South Saqqara Stone: early in his reign he offered 30 oxen to an unidentified god and five to Wadjet. To Seth he offered a lost number of oxen. A statue of the king might also have been erected in the first couple of years of his reign. Additional offerings can be inferred from the surviving remnants of the texts, numbering hundreds or even thousands of oxen, lapis-lazuli, loincloths, incense to Ptah, Heryshaf, Nefertum and the Ennead, hundreds of birds and perfumed oil to Khenti-Amentiu, and silver objects and kohl to Khenti-kheti. The list of offerings also mentions Djedkare Isesi, penultimate king of the Fifth Dynasty, who seems to have been held in high esteem during Merenre's reign. Merenre even chose to place his pyramid complex close to that of Djedkare.

In addition to these activities, Merenre made a decree pertaining to the funerary cult of Menkaure as shown by fragmentary inscriptions uncovered in the latter's mortuary temple.

==== Construction works ====
The main monument dating to Merenre's reign is his pyramid complex. Apart from this, there are tentative indications that Merenre had work carried out in the temple of Osiris and Khenti-Amentiu in modern-day Kom el-Sultan, near Abydos. There, fragments of several private stelae dating to his reign were uncovered in the temple's foundations, which was completely renovated in the 12th dynasty (c. 1990–1800 BC). The nature and extent of the works undertaken at the time cannot be fully ascertained; possibly Merenre had a Ka-chapel built there following his father who built such chapels extensively throughout Egypt. (Note: Ka-chapels were small cult buildings comprising one or more chambers to hold offerings dedicated to the cult of the Ka of a deceased or, in this case, the king.)

=== End of reign ===
A second co-regency between Merenre and Pepi II has been proposed by Stevenson Smith following the discovery of a cylinder seal in Tell el-Maskhuta. The seal, belonging to an administrative official, is inscribed with "the King of Upper and Lower Egypt Merenre, living forever like Re" and shows the king smiting an enemy and the Horus names of both Merenre and Pepi II in serekhs facing one another. This evidence for a shared reign is circumstantial and could equally well indicate that the official meant to convey that he served in the army under both kings, or that the kings were close kin. Given Pepi II's youth on acceding to the throne and Merenre's likely short reign, William J. Murnane and others after him including Anthony Spalinger and Nigel Strudwick have rejected the idea of a co-regency between the two rulers. In contrast for Miroslav Bárta the possibility of this co-regency cannot be excluded.

== Foreign activities ==
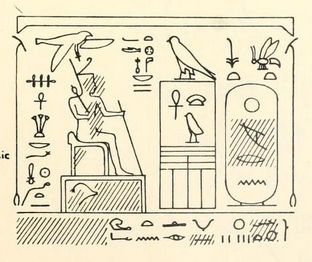
Inscription of Merenre from Hatnub

=== Eastern Desert and Levant ===
Merenre sent at least one mining expedition to Wadi Hammamat in the Eastern Desert to collect greywacke and siltstone. Weni, who began his career under Teti, rose through the ranks of the administration under Pepi I was the leader of this expedition and reported its goal:

His majesty sent me to Ibhat (Note: Most likely the Wadi Hammamat is the modern name for the place named Jbhꜣ.t in the biography of Weni, who led expeditions there.) especially to bring back the sarcophagus "Chest of the living" and its lid, as well as a costly and noble pyramidion for the pyramid of Merenre, my mistress.

The expedition left two inscriptions in the Wadi, indicating that it took place on the year of the second cattle count, probably Merenre's fourth year on the throne. Alabaster was extracted from Hatnub, also in the Eastern Desert, a location where an expedition under the leadership of Weni was tasked with the quarrying of a very large travertine altar stone for the pyramid of Merenre:

Horus Ankhkhau, the king of Upper and Lower Egypt Merenre. The Behdetite. The perfect god, lord of the Two Lands. May all protection and life be behind him like Re for ever. Year after the fifth occasion. A mission which the Haty-a overseer of Upper Egypt, sole companion, Weni carried out.

While there is no direct evidence for Egyptian activity in Sinai specifically during Merenre's reign, frequent expeditions were sent in the region for turquoise and other resources during the Fifth and Sixth Dynasties. Egypt in all probability maintained diplomatic and trade relations with Byblos to procure cedar wood, and with Canaan and the wider Levant—then in the Early Bronze Age IV to Middle Bronze Age I period—as witnessed by imported jars found in the tombs of Idi and Weni. Further abroad, the high official Iny, who served under Pepi I, Merenre and Pepi II, either led or participated in a sea-borne mission to Byblos and other cities, possibly during Merenre's rule, to obtain lapis lazuli, silver, bitumen and lead or tin. In addition, a possible military campaign in the southern Levant which Weni may have conducted under Pepi I shows the continuing interest in those regions to the east and northeast of the Nile Delta on behalf of the Egyptian state at the time.

=== Nubia ===
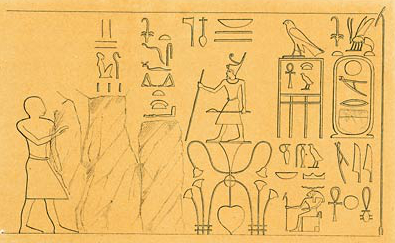
Drawing of a relief from Aswan showing Merenre receiving the submission of Lower Nubian chieftains, possibly dated to his first regnal year

During Merenre's reign Lower Nubia was the focus of Egypt's foreign policy interests. Two rock reliefs depict the king receiving the submission of Nubian chieftains, the earlier of which, located on the ancient route from Aswan to Philae near the First Cataract, shows Merenre standing on the symbol for the union of the two lands, suggesting that it was carved during his first year of reign. Toward the end of the Old Kingdom period, Nubia saw the arrival of the C-Group people from the south. Centred at Kerma, they struggled intermittently with Egypt and its allies over control of the region which, for the Egyptians, was a source of incense, ebony, animal skins, ivory and exotic animals. Three Egyptian hosts were sent in expeditions by Merenre to procure luxury goods from Lower Nubia, where tribes had united to form a state, into the land of Yam, possibly modern-day Dongola or Shendi.

These expeditions took place under the direction of the caravan conductor and later nomarch of Elephantine Harkhuf. He claimed to have pacified the land South of Egypt but his expeditions likely constituted a labour force and a traders' caravan above all. The aim of such expeditions was first and foremost to exploit resources the locals would not or could not use, and only rarely did they have to fight. The first expedition, during which Harkhuf was accompanied by his father the lector priest Iri, lasted for seven months while the second took eight months. On the third expedition, which took place at the end of Merenre's reign or early in Pepi II's, Harkhuf was informed that the king of Yam had gone to war against the Tjemehu people, possibly Libyans or people to the west of Nubia. He consequently either joined his forces with those of Yam, in order to defeat their adversaries and gain riches; or he caught up with the king of Yam to prevent the outbreak of hostilities. The ruler of Irtjet, Setju and Wawat might have further threatened to interfere with Harkhuf's return to Egypt but changed stance, offering cattle and goats to Harkhuf. This was possibly after he had received gifts or because of Harkhuf's strong escort. At any rate, Harkhuf went to great length to explain to the king his unexpected delays as the duration of these expeditions was a matter of pride to him. He was greeted in return by an envoy from the court bringing date-wine, cakes, bread, and beer. Such expeditions, each of which represented a 2,000–3,000 kilometres (1,200–1,900 mi) round-trip journey, took the form of large caravans of donkeys. The third one led by Harkhuf numbered three hundred asses carrying various goods including incense, ebony and grain in large storage jars. To meet the demands of trade within Egypt and outside of Egypt for pack animals, donkeys were raised in large numbers in Egypt since at least the Fourth Dynasty.

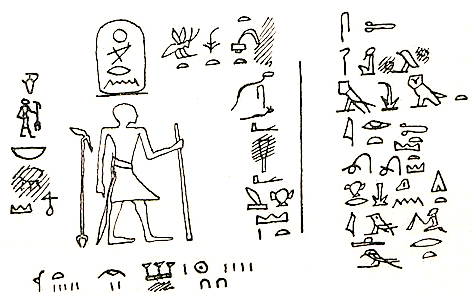
Relief from El-Hesseh depicting Merenre and mentioning the submission of Lower Nubia, from his fifth year of reign

In the year of the fifth cattle count since the beginning of his reign, Merenre travelled south to Elephantine from his capital to receive the submission of Nubian chieftains. This is indicated by an inscription and relief located opposite the cataract island of El-Hesseh near Philae:

The king of Upper and Lower Egypt Merenre, beloved of Khnum, lord of the cataract region. Year of the fifth occasion, second month of the Shemu season, day 28. A visit from the king himself, when he stood at the far end of the foreign lands: the rulers of Medja, Irertjt and Wawat kissed the ground and gave great praise.

On the same occasion, Merenre might also have visited the temple of Satet on Elephantine island to renew a naos erected by Pepi I. This is suggested by another inscription of Merenre on the rock face of a natural grotto in a niche of the temple:

Year of the fifth occasion, second month of the Shemu season, day 24. A visit from the king himself, when he made prisoners of the rulers of the foreign lands: the king of Upper and Lower Egypt Merenre, may he live for ever.

Besides Harkhuf, another Egyptian high official who was active in Nubia at the time was Weni, who had been promoted to commander of the army by Pepi I. As such Weni hired Nubian mercenaries for his military campaigns in Sinai and the Levant, mercenaries which were also frequently employed as police force. Weni was also tasked with bringing back from Elephantine to Memphis a false door of granite and granite doorway and lintels for the upper chamber of the pyramid complex of Merenre. He did so, sailing down-stream with six cargo-boats, three tow boats and one warship, finally mooring by the pyramid. The tow-boats were large barges capable of transporting heavy loads; Weni's biography gives their dimensions as 31 m (102 ft) in length and 15.5 m (51 ft)-wide. Overall, Egyptian activities in Lower Nubia were sufficiently important that Weni was directed to oversee the excavation of a five-channels canal near modern-day Shellal. The canal ran parallel to the Nile, in order to facilitate the navigation of the First Cataract. On the same occasion, Weni had seven boats of acacia built from timber he had received from Nubian chieftains.

== Pyramid complex ==
=== Main pyramid ===
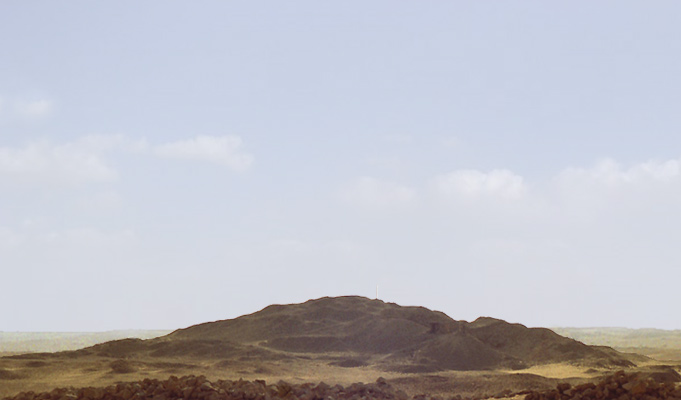
The ruined pyramid of Merenre

The pyramid of Merenre was built at South Saqqara. The Ancient Egyptians named it Khanefermerenre, which is variously translated as "Merenre appears in glory and is beautiful", "The perfection of Merenre rises", "The appearance of the perfection of Merenre", and "Merenre appears and is beautiful". The pyramid is located 450 m (1,480 ft) to the south-west of the pyramid of Pepi I and a similar distance to the pyramid of Djedkare. The pyramid originally reached a height of 100 Egyptian cubits, c. 52.5 m (172 ft), and had a square base side-length of 150 cubits, c. 79 m (259 ft). This would give the elevation of Merenre's pyramid a hypotenuse of 125 cubits, and consequently an elevation (slope) in the same proportion as Khafre's pyramid at Giza. The triangle formed by half of the base, the height, and the hypotenuse (75, 100, 125 cubits) form a Pythagorean Triple, reduceable to proportions of 3,4,5. It may have been accessed via a causeway starting from a harbour located on the nearby Wadi Tafla, some 300 m (980 ft) away, but also 27 m (89 ft) below. Fine limestone for the pyramid was quarried in Tura, the quarries being administered from Saqqara or Memphis.

The inner passages of the pyramid were laid out according to those found in Djedkare Isesi's pyramid. They are inscribed with the Pyramid Texts. Discovered by the Egyptologist Gaston Maspero at the end of the nineteenth century, the texts of the pyramid of Merenre were only published in full in 2019 by the Egyptologist Isabelle Pierre-Croisiau. The north wall of the burial chamber, now completely ruined, bore offering ritual formulae which continued onto the east wall, as is the case in the pyramids of Unas, Teti and Pepi I. The Pyramid Texts are made of hundreds of utterances organised in groups of inscriptions, yet in different copies the utterances could be in varying position within a group and exchanged between groups. This reveals some editorial dynamism in the composition of the rites they represent. The south and west wall of the burial chamber of Merenre bear texts concerning the transfiguration of the king.

On the east wall are utterances calling for the perpetuation of the cult of the deceased ruler, while two further groups of texts on the resurrection of Horus and the protection of Nut are found on the opposite wall. The rest of the texts found in the burial chamber pertain to the anointing and wrapping of the king, his provisioning, summons by Isis and Nephthys, and the ascent to the sky. Leading out of the sarcophagus chamber, the walls of the antechamber bear texts calling for the king's joining the company of the gods and apotropaic formulae. The remaining corridors and vestibules of the tomb bear utterances on the celestial circuit of the king and gods.

=== Mortuary temple ===
The pyramid of Merenre is surrounded by a wider mortuary complex, its offering chapel located on the north face of the pyramid. Fragments of reliefs showing the gods greeting the king in the afterlife have been uncovered there. The hall of the chapel is paved with limestone. Further on stands the base of a granite false-door. Some of the decoration of the complex was left unfinished, as work likely stopped at the death of the king.

=== Mummy ===
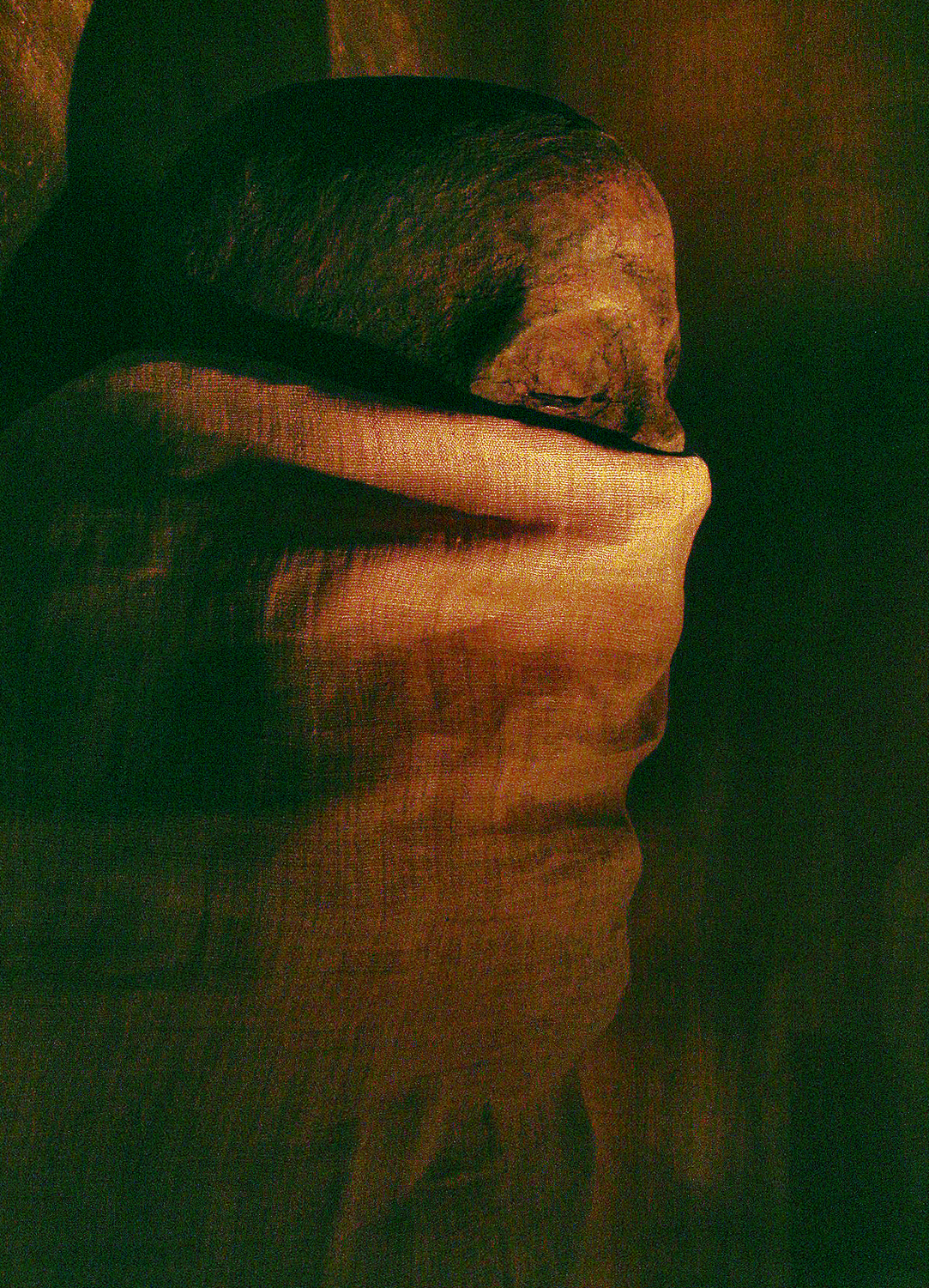
Mummified head found in the burial chamber of the pyramid of Merenre

In 1881 the Egyptologists Émile and Heinrich Karl Brugsch managed to enter the burial chamber of Merenre's pyramid via a robber's tunnel. They found its massive ceiling beams of limestone hanging dangerously as the lower retaining walls of the chamber had been removed by stone robbers. The black basalt sarcophagus was still intact, its lid pushed back, and in it lay the mummy of a 1.66 m (5.4 ft)-tall man. The mummy was in a poor condition because ancient tomb robbers had partially torn off its wrappings. The Brugsch brothers decided to transport the mummy to Cairo, in order to show it to Auguste Mariette, head of the Egyptian Department of Antiquities and by then dying. During the transport the mummy suffered further damage: problems with the railroads prevented the mummy from being taken to Cairo by train and the Brugschs took the decision to carry it on foot. After the wooden sarcophagus employed to that end had become too heavy, they took out the mummy and broke it into two pieces. The mummy was first housed in the various incarnations of the Egyptian Museum in Cairo, until moved to the Imhotep Museum at Saqqara in 2006. Émile Brugsch donated some fragments, a collarbone, cervical vertebrae and a rib to the Egyptian Museum of Berlin. These have not been located since World War II.

Preliminary forensic analyses of the mummy by Grafton Elliot Smith indicate that it is that of a young man, as suggested by possible traces of a sidelock of youth. The identity of the mummy remains uncertain as Elliot Smith observed that the technique employed for the wrapping was typical of the Eighteenth Dynasty (fl. c. 1550–1292 BC) rather than the Sixth. Re-wrapping of older mummies is known to have occurred, so that this observation does not necessarily preclude that the mummy is that of Merenre. The mummy has not been properly studied since Elliott Smith's analyses in the early 20th century, and its identification remains uncertain.

== Legacy ==
=== Old Kingdom ===
Like other kings of the Fifth and Sixth Dynasties, Merenre was the object of an official, state-sponsored funerary cult which took place in his pyramid complex. In the mid-Sixth Dynasty, nomarchs were overseer of the priests of such cults. For instance, Qar, nomarch of Edfu and Gegi, nomarch of the Thinite nome, were "instructor of the priests of the pyramid 'Merenre appears and is beautiful'"; Heqaib, nomarch of the first nome of Upper Egypt under Pepi II, was "leader of the phyle (Note: A phyle is a group of part-time workers serving in the mortuary cults and work crews during the Old Kingdom in Egypt.) of the pyramid of Merenre".

Some of the priests serving the cult in the pyramid complex of Merenre are known by name, including Iarti and his son Merenreseneb; a certain Meru called Bebi; and Nipepy, who also officiated in the pyramid of Pepi I. Another piece of evidence concerning this cult comes from a decree of Pepi II exempting people living in the pyramid town of Merenre from tax or corvée. A fragmentary papyrus letter from a certain Ankhpepy, (Note: Now in the Egyptian Museum, Cairo, inventory JE 52001A.) inspector of the royal granary at the pyramid town of Merenre, further confirms its existence and prosperity at the time of Merenre's and Pepi II's reigns:

...[of] the pyramid of Merenre, which is made in excellent fashion ... of stone; in accordance with my orders I have spent a year at the pyramid of Merenre, which is indeed prospering...

A few priests serving the funerary cult of Merenre during the later Sixth Dynasty are known; for example the priest Idu Seneni served in both Merenre's and Pepi II's pyramids. The cult was active even outside of Merenre's mortuary temple at Saqqara: inscriptions in Elkab attest to the presence of priests of this cult officiating in or in the vicinity of the local temple of Nekhbet. This perhaps persisted into the First Intermediate Period, as possibly witnessed by the career of Menankhpepy. (Note: Menankhpepy, mn-ꜥnḫ-ppy meaning "Pepi's life is enduring" is also known as Meny Mnỉ, his good name.) Menankhpepy served as priest in the pyramid complex of Merenre but uncertainties on the precise dating of his lifetime hinder positive conclusions on the persistence of Merenre's cult in the turmoil of the First Intermediate Period. The Egyptologists Henry George Fischer and Ludwig Borchardt proposed that Menankhpepy lived during the Ninth or Eleventh Dynasties, respectively, while recent reappraisals have led to a Sixth Dynasty dating. (Note: Some of the publications supporting a Sixth Dynasty dating for Menankhpepy appeared before Fischer's death but left him unconvinced.)

=== Later periods ===
The deposit of cultic objects comprising the two bronze statues of Pepi I and possibly Merenre uncovered by James Quibell in Hierakonpolis was in all probability placed there during building works in the early Middle Kingdom period. This deposit, and others like it found in the temple area, is composed of ceremonial objects and statuary dating from the earlier periods. This suggests some cultic practices with them up to that point.

Similarly, some cult of Merenre existed or was revived in the New Kingdom period as shown by the presence of his cartouche on the Karnak King List. The list was composed during the reign of Thutmosis III (c. 1479–1425 BC) with the purpose of honouring a selection of royal ancestors.

Merenre is the name of the pharaoh and one of the main protagonists in the 1998 French-language animated cartoon series ''Papyrus''. The cartoon depicts him as a benevolent ruler, father of the main heroine, princess Théti-Chéri. However in the original comics Papyrus the animation is based on, the pharaoh is named after Merneptah instead.

== Bibliography ==
- Abubakr, Abdel Moneim; Osing, Jürgen (1973). "Ächtungstexte aus dem Alten Reich" (PDF). Mitteilungen des Deutschen Archäologischen Instituts – Abteilung Kairo (in German). 29 (2). Mainz: Philipp von Zabern: XXX–LVI.
- Adams, Barbara (1990). "A Fragment from the Cairo Statue of Khasekhemwy". The Journal of Egyptian Archaeology. 76. Sage Publications, Ltd.: 161–163. doi:10.2307/3822016. JSTOR 3822016.
- Allen, James; Allen, Susan; Anderson, Julie; Arnold, Arnold; Arnold, Dorothea; Cherpion, Nadine; David, Élisabeth; Grimal, Nicolas; Grzymski, Krzysztof; Hawass, Zahi; Hill, Marsha; Jánosi, Peter; Labée-Toutée, Sophie; Labrousse, Audran; Lauer, Jean-Phillippe; Leclant, Jean; Der Manuelian, Peter; Millet, N. B.; Oppenheim, Adela; Craig Patch, Diana; Pischikova, Elena; Rigault, Patricia; Roehrig, Catharine H.; Wildung, Dietrich; Ziegler, Christiane (1999). Egyptian Art in the Age of the Pyramids. New York: The Metropolitan Museum of Art. OCLC 41431623.
- Allen, James Peter (2004). "Review: Mission Archéologique Française de Saqqâra: Les Textes de la Pyramide de Pépy Ier. by Catherine Berger-El Naggar, Jean Leclant and Isabelle Pierre-Croisiau". The Journal of Egyptian Archaeology. 90. Sage Publications, Ltd: 12–16. doi:10.1177/030751330409001S07. JSTOR 3822273. S2CID 192298220.
- Altenmüller, Hartwig (2001). "Old Kingdom: Sixth Dynasty". In Redford, Donald B. (ed.). The Oxford Encyclopedia of Ancient Egypt, Volume 2. Oxford: Oxford University Press. pp. 601–605. ISBN 978-0-19-510234-5.
- Andrassy, Petra (2008). "Untersuchungen zum Ägyptischen Staat des Alten Reiches und seinen Institutionen". Internetbeiträge zur Ägyptologie und Sudanarchäologie (in German). 11. Berlin, London: Golden House Publications. ISBN 978-1-906137-08-3.
- Angelini, Andrea; Capriotti Vittozzi, Giuseppina; Baldi, Marina (2016). "The high official Harkhuf and the inscriptions of his tomb in Aswan (Egypt). An integrated methodological approach". Acta Imeko. 5 (2): 71–79. doi:10.21014/acta_imeko.v5i2.349. ISSN 2221-870X.
- Anthes, Rudolf (1928). Sethe, Kurt (ed.). "Die Felseninschriften von Hatnub / nach den Aufnahmen Georg Möllers; herasugegeben und bearbeitet von Rudolf Anthes". Untersuchungen zur Geschichte und Altertumskunde Aegyptens. 9. Leipzig: J. C. Hinrichs. hdl:2333.1/z612jxf7. OCLC 241525038.
- Arnold, Elizabeth; Beller, Jeremy; Behar, Adi; Ben-Shlomo, David; Greenfield, Tina L.; Greenfield, Haskel J. (2017). "Interregional Trade and Exchange at Early Bronze Age Tell eṣ-Ṣâfi/Gath". Near Eastern Archaeology. 80 (4 The Tell eṣ-Ṣâfi/Gath Archaeological Project): 264–267. doi:10.5615/neareastarch.80.4.0264. JSTOR neareastarch.80.4.0264. S2CID 165833928.
- Baines, John; Yoffee, Norman (1998). "Order, Legitimacy, and Wealth in Ancient Egypt and Mesopotamia". In Feinman, G.M.; Marcus, J. (eds.). Archaic States. Santa Fe, NM: School of American Research Press. pp. 199–260. OCLC 1119736998.
- Baker, Darrell (2008). The Encyclopedia of the Pharaohs: Volume I – Predynastic to the Twentieth Dynasty 3300–1069 BC. London: Stacey International. ISBN 978-1-905299-37-9.
- Bárta, Miroslav (2013). "Egyptian Kingship during the Old Kingdom". In Hill, Jane A.; Jones, Philip; Morales, Antonio J. (eds.). Experiencing Power, Generating Authority. Cosmos, Politics, and the Ideology of Kingship in Ancient Egypt and Mesopotamia. Philadelphia: University of Pennsylvania Museum of Archaeology and Anthropology. pp. 257–283. ISBN 978-1-934536-64-3.
- Bárta, Miroslav (2017). "Radjedef to the Eighth Dynasty". UCLA Encyclopedia of Egyptology.
- Baud, Michel; Dobrev, Vassil (1995). "De Nouvelles Annales de l'Ancien Empire Égyptien. Une "Pierre de Palerme" pour la VIe Dynastie". Bulletin de l'Institut Français d'Archéologie Orientale (in French). 95: 23–92. ISSN 0255-0962.
- Baud, Michel (1999a). Famille Royale et Pouvoir sous l'Ancien Empire Égyptien. Tome 1 (PDF). Bibliothèque d'étude 126/1 (in French). Cairo: Institut français d'archéologie orientale. ISBN 978-2-7247-0250-7.
- Baud, Michel (1999b). Famille Royale et Pouvoir sous l'Ancien Empire Égyptien. Tome 2 (PDF). Bibliothèque d'étude 126/2 (in French). Cairo: Institut français d'archéologie orientale. ISBN 978-2-7247-0250-7. Archived from the original (PDF) on 2 April 2015.
- Baud, Michel (2006). "The Relative Chronology of Dynasties 6 and 8". In Hornung, Erik; Krauss, Rolf; Warburton, David (eds.). Ancient Egyptian Chronology. Handbook of Oriental Studies. Leiden: Brill Publishers. pp. 144–159. ISBN 978-9-04-740400-2.
- Beckerath, Jürgen von (1997). Chronologie des pharaonischen Ägypten : die Zeitbestimmung der ägyptischen Geschichte von der Vorzeit bis 332 v. Chr. Münchner ägyptologische Studien (in German). Vol. 46. Mainz am Rhein: Philipp von Zabern. ISBN 978-3-8053-2310-9.
- Beckerath, Jürgen von (1999). Handbuch der ägyptischen Königsnamen. Münchner ägyptologische Studien (in German). Mainz: Philip von Zabern. ISBN 978-3-8053-2591-2.
- Biga, Maria Giovanna (2017). "Voies Commerciales, Ports et Marchands de Syrie, Anatolie et Méditerranée Orientale au IIIe Millénaire av. J.-C". Pallas. Ekklèsia. Approches croisées d'histoire politique et religieuse: Mélanges offerts à Marie-Françoise Baslez (in French). 104 (104): 51–59. doi:10.4000/pallas.7204. JSTOR 26577507.
- "Biographies of Person and Place: The Tomb Complex of Weni the Elder at Abydos, Vols. I and II". The President and Fellows of Harvard College. 2023.
- Bissing, Friedrich Wilhelm von (1907). Catalogue général des antiquités égyptiennes du Musée du Caire. Nos. 18065–18793. Steingefäße (in German). Vienne: Holzhausen. OCLC 912985262.
- Bolshakov, Andrey (2001). "Ka-Chapel". In Redford, Donald B. (ed.). The Oxford Encyclopedia of Ancient Egypt, Volume 2. Oxford: Oxford University Press. pp. 217–219. ISBN 978-0-19-510234-5.
- Bongioanni, Alessandro; Croce, Maria, eds. (2001). The Treasures of Ancient Egypt: From the Egyptian Museum in Cairo. New York: Universe Publishing, a division of Ruzzoli Publications Inc. ISBN 978-0-78-930986-0.
- Borchardt, Ludwig (1964). Denkmäler des Alten Reiches. Teil II (PDF). Catalogue Général des Antiquités Égyptiennes du Musée du Caire (in German). Vol. 1295–1808. Cairo: Organisme Général des Imprimeries Gouvernementales. OCLC 492962019.
- "Box, Merenra". British Museum. 15 April 2023.
- Brand, Peter J. (2002). "Reviewed Work: Abusir and Saqqara in the Year 2000 by Miroslav Bárta, Jaromír Krejčí". Journal of the American Research Center in Egypt. 39: 254–256. doi:10.2307/40001162. JSTOR 40001162. S2CID 191611152.
- Breasted, James Henry (1906). Ancient Records of Egypt. Historical Documents from the Earliest Times to the Persian Conquest. Volume I: The first to the Seventeenth Dynasty (PDF). Vol. 2. Chicago: The Chicago University press. OCLC 936730473.
- Brovarski, Edward (1994). "Abydos in the Old Kingdom and First Intermediate Period, Part II". In Silverman, David P. (ed.). For His Ka: Essays Offered in Memory of Klaus Baer. Studies in Ancient Oriental Civilization. Vol. 55. Chicago: The Oriental Institute of the University of Chicago. pp. 15–45. ISBN 0-918986-93-1.
- Brovarski, Edward (2001). Der Manuelian, Peter; Simpson, William Kelly (eds.). The Senedjemib Complex, Part 1. The Mastabas of Senedjemib Inti (G 2370), Khnumenti (G 2374), and Senedjemib Mehi (G 2378). Giza Mastabas. Vol. 7. Boston: Art of the Ancient World, Museum of Fine Arts. ISBN 978-0-87846-479-1.
- Bußmann, Richard (2010). "Der Kult für die Königsmutter Anchenes-Merire I. im Tempel des Chontamenti. Zwei unpublizierte Türstürze der 6. Dynastie aus Abydos". Studien zur Altägyptischen Kultur (in German). 39. Helmut Buske Verlag GmbH: 101–119. JSTOR 41060759.
- Callender, Vivienne Gae (1994). "Part III. A prosopographical register of the wives of the Egyptian Kings (Dynasties I–XVII)". The Wives of the Egyptian Kings: Dynasties I–XVII. Sydney, Australia: Macquarie University. School of History, Philosophy, and Politics. OCLC 862671624. Archived from the original on 27 April 2022.
- Callender, Vivienne Gae (2002). "Princess Inti of the Ancient Egyptian Sixth Dynasty". Journal of Near Eastern Studies. 61 (4): 267–274. doi:10.1086/469041. JSTOR 3128942. S2CID 162296379.
- Carlens, Louis (2003). "Le transport fluvial de charges lourdes dans l'Égypte antique". Studien zur Altägyptischen Kultur (in French). 31: 9–31. JSTOR 25152882.
- Clayton, Peter (1994). Chronicle of the Pharaohs. New York: Thames & Hudson. ISBN 978-0-500-05074-3.
- Collombert, Philippe (2011). "Découvertes récentes de la mission archéologique française à Saqqâra (campagnes 2007–2011)". Comptes rendus des séances de l'Académie des Inscriptions et Belles-Lettres (in French). 155 (2). Persée: 921–938. doi:10.3406/crai.2011.93230.
- Collombert, Philippe (2018). "Recent discoveries of the Mission archéologique franco-suisse de Saqqâra in the funerary complex of queen Ankhnespepy II" (PDF). Saqqara Newsletter. 16. Leiden: Friends of Saqqara Foundation: 66–75.
- Couyat, Jean; Montet, Pierre (1913). "Les inscriptions hiéroglyphiques et hiératiques du Ouâdi Hammâmât". Mémoires publiés par les membres de l'Institut français d'archéologie orientale (in French). 34. Cairo: Institut français d'archéologie orientale. OCLC 19833807.
- Davies, Norman de Garies (1902). The Rock Tombs of Deir el Gebrâwi. Part I: Tomb of Aba and Smaller Tombs of the Southern Group. London: Egypt Exploration Fund. OCLC 499445112.
- Dodson, Aidan; Hilton, Dyan (2004). The Complete Royal Families of Ancient Egypt. London: Thames & Hudson. ISBN 978-0-500-05128-3.
- Dominas, Konrad; Trocha, Bogdan; Wesołowska, Elżbieta (2016). Antiquity in Popular Literature and Culture. International Conference on Fantasy and Wonder. Newcastle upon Tyne: Cambridge Scholars Publishing. ISBN 978-1-44-389318-3.
- Drioton, Étienne (1947). "Notes Diverses. 2, Une Corégence de Pépi Ier et de Mérenrê (?)". Annales du service des antiquités de l'Égypte (in French). 45. Cairo: Conseil suprême des Antiquités égyptiennes: 53–92.
- Edel, Elmar (1967). "Die Ländernamen Unternubiens und die Ausbreitung der C-Gruppe nach den Reiseberichten des Ḥrw-ḫwjf". Orientalia, NOVA SERIES (in German). 36 (2): 133–158. JSTOR 43074152.
- El-Khadragy, Mahmoud (2002). "The Edfu Offering Niche of Qar in the Cairo Museum". Studien zur Altägyptischen Kultur. 30: 203–228. JSTOR 25152867.
- Fischer, Henry George (1954). "Four Provincial Administrators at the Memphite Cemeteries". Journal of the American Oriental Society. 74 (1): 26–34. doi:10.2307/595477. JSTOR 595477.
- Fischer, Henry George (1958). "Review: Tell Basta by Labib Habachi". American Journal of Archaeology. 62 (3): 330–333. doi:10.2307/501964. JSTOR 501964.
- Fischer, Henry George (1968). Dendera in the Third Millennium B.C. Down to the Theban Domination of Upper Egypt. Locust Valley, New York: J. J. Augustin. OCLC 20712.
- Fischer, Henry George (2001). "A Unique Composite Hieroglyph". Journal of the American Research Center in Egypt. 38: 1–6. doi:10.2307/40000548. JSTOR 40000548.
- Franke, Detlef (1993). "Review: The Rock Tombs of El-Hawawish. The Cemetery of Akhmim. Vol. VII (1987) by Naguib Kanawati; The Rock Tombs of El-Hawawish. The Cemetery of Akhmim. Vol. VIII (1988) by Naguib Kanawati; The Rock Tombs of El-Hawawish. The Cemetery of Akhmim. Vol. IX (1989) by Naguib Kanawati; Quseir El-Amarna. The Tombs of Pepy-Ankh and Khewen-wekh by Ali El-Khouli, Naguib Kanawati". The Journal of Egyptian Archaeology. 79: 288–292. JSTOR 3822182.
- Gardiner, Alan (1945). "Regnal Years and Civil Calendar in Pharaonic Egypt". The Journal of Egyptian Archaeology. 31: 11–28. doi:10.1177/030751334503100103. JSTOR 3855380. S2CID 192251888.
- Gardiner, Alan (1959). The Royal Canon of Turin. Oxford: Griffith Institute. OCLC 21484338.
- Gasse, Annie (2016). "Wadi Hammamat on the Road to Punt" (PDF). Abgadiyat. 11. Alexandria: Brill: 44–50. doi:10.1163/22138609-90000041. ISSN 2213-8609.
- Germer, Renate (2005). Mumien (in German). Düsseldorf: Albatros. ISBN 978-3-49-196153-1.
- Gilbert, Gregory P. (2004). "Three Recently Excavated Funerary Stelae from the Eighth Dynasty Tomb of Shemai at Kom el-Momanien, Qift". The Journal of Egyptian Archaeology. 90: 73–79. doi:10.1177/030751330409000105. JSTOR 3822245. S2CID 188981661.
- Goedicke, Hans (1988). "The Death of Pepi II-Neferkare". Studien zur Altägyptischen Kultur. 15. Hamburg: Helmut Buske Verlag GmbH: 111–121. JSTOR 44324580.
- Grajetzki, Wolfram (2005). Ancient Egyptian Queens: a Hieroglyphic Dictionary. London: Golden House Publications. ISBN 978-0-95-472189-3.
- Grimal, Nicolas (1992). A History of Ancient Egypt. Translated by Ian Shaw. Oxford: Blackwell Publishing. ISBN 978-0-631-19396-8.
- Hayes, William (1978). The Scepter of Egypt: A Background for the Study of the Egyptian Antiquities in The Metropolitan Museum of Art. Vol. 1, From the Earliest Times to the End of the Middle Kingdom. New York: Metropolitan Museum of Art. OCLC 7427345.
- Hays, Harold M. (2012). "Chapter two. Groups and Series of Pyramid Texts". The Organization of the Pyramid Texts (2 vols.): Typology and Disposition. Probleme der Ägyptoloie. Vol. 31. Leiden, Boston: Brill Academic Publishers. pp. 79–124. ISBN 978-9-00-421865-9. JSTOR j.ctt1w76tzs.12.
- Hendrickx, Stan (1999). "Elkab". In Bard, Kathryn A.; Blake Shubert, Steven (eds.). Encyclopedia of the Archeology of Ancient Egypt. New York: Routledge. pp. 342–346. ISBN 978-0-203-98283-9.
- Hornung, Erik; Krauss, Rolf; Warburton, David, eds. (2012). Ancient Egyptian Chronology. Handbook of Oriental Studies. Leiden, Boston: Brill. ISBN 978-90-04-11385-5. ISSN 0169-9423.
- Jeffreys, David (1999). "Tura, Dynastic Burials and Quarries". In Bard, Kathryn A.; Blake Shubert, Steven (eds.). Encyclopedia of the Archeology of Ancient Egypt. New York: Routledge. pp. 1039–1041. ISBN 978-0-203-98283-9.
- Kanawati, Naguib (1992). "Review: The Administration of Egypt in the Old Kingdom: The Highest Titles and Their Holders by Nigel Strudwick". The Journal of Egyptian Archaeology. 78: 326–328. JSTOR 3822094.
- Kanawati, Naguib (2003). Conspiracies in the Egyptian Palace: Unis to Pepy I. Oxford and New York: Routledge. ISBN 0-415-61937-8.
- Kanawati, Naguib (2005). "Decoration of Burial Chambers, Sarcophagi and Coffins in the Old Kingdom". In Daoud, K.; Bedier, S.; Abd El-Fatah, S. (eds.). Studies in Honor of Ali Radwan 2. Cairo: Conseil Suprême des Antiquités de l'Égypte. pp. 55–71. ISBN 977-305-826-3.
- Katary, Sally (2001). "Taxation". In Redford (ed.). The Oxford Encyclopedia of Ancient Egypt, Volume 3. Oxford: Oxford University Press. pp. 351–356. ISBN 978-0-19-510234-5.
- Kemp, Barry J. (1989). Ancient Egypt: Anatomy of a Civilization. London: Routledge. ISBN 978-0-41-501281-2.
- Knoblauch, Christian (2010). "Preliminary Report on the Early Bronze Age III Pottery from the Contexts of the 6th Dynasty in the Abydos Middle Cemetery". Ägypten und Levante / Egypt and the Levant. 20: 243–261. doi:10.1553/AEundL20s243. JSTOR 23789941.
- Krauss, Rolf (2021). "Late Old Kingdom Chronology, Another Model". Ägypten und Levante / Egypt and the Levant. 31: 293–300. doi:10.1553/AEundL31s293. JSTOR 27153344. S2CID 245590988.
- Kurth, Angela (1992). "Usurpation, Conquest and Ceremonial: From Babylon to Persia". In Cannadine, David; Price, Simon (eds.). Rituals of Royalty: Power and Ceremonial in Traditional Societies. Cambridge: Cambridge University Press. pp. 20–55. ISBN 9780521428910.
- Lehner, Mark (1997). The Complete Pyramids. New York: Thames & Hudson. ISBN 978-0-500-28547-3.
- Leprohon, Ronald J. (2013). The Great Name: Ancient Egyptian Royal Titulary. Writings from the ancient world, no. 33. Atlanta: Society of Biblical Literature. ISBN 978-1-58983-736-2.
- Lepsius, Karl Richard (1972). Denkmäler aus Ægypten und Æthiopien (in German). Geneva: Éditions de Belles-Lettres. OCLC 941020412.
- Macy Roth, Ann (1991). Egyptian Phyles in the Old Kingdom: The Evolution of a System of Social Organization. Studies in Ancient Oriental Civilization. Vol. 48. Chicago, Ill.: Oriental Institute of the University of Chicago. ISBN 978-0-91-898668-9.
- Jaromír, Málek; Magee, Diana; Miles, Elizabeth; Porter, Bertha; Moss, Rosalind L. B. (1999). "Indices to parts 1 and 2. Statues.". Topographical Bibliography of Ancient Egyptian Hieroglyphic Texts, Statues, Reliefs and Paintings. VIII, Objects of provenance not known (PDF). Oxford: Griffith Institute. ISBN 978-0-900416-70-5.
- Málek, Jaromir (2000). "The Old Kingdom (c. 2160–2055 BC)". In Shaw, Ian (ed.). The Oxford History of Ancient Egypt. Oxford University Press. pp. 83–107. ISBN 978-0-19-815034-3.
- Marcolin, Michele (2006). "Iny, a much-traveled official of the Sixth Dynasty: unpublished reliefs in Japan". In Bárta, Miroslav; Coppens, Filip; Krejčí, Jaromír (eds.). Abusir and Saqqara in the Year 2005, Proceedings of the Conference held in Prague (June 27 – July 5, 2005). Prague: Academy of Sciences of the Czech Republic, Oriental Institute. pp. 282–310. ISBN 978-80-7308-116-4.
- Mende, Christine (2008). "Zum Mumienfund in der Pyramide Merenres I". Sokar (in German). 17 (2). Berlin: Verlag Michael Haase: 40–43.
- Muhly, James (1999). "Metallurgy". In Bard, Kathryn A.; Blake Shubert, Steven (eds.). Encyclopedia of the Archeology of Ancient Egypt. New York: Routledge. pp. 628–634. ISBN 978-0-203-98283-9.
- Murnane, William J. (1977). Ancient Egyptian Coregencies. Studies in Ancient Oriental Civilization. Vol. 40. Chicago: The Oriental Institute. ISBN 978-0-91-898603-0.
- O'Connor, David (1986). "The Locations of Yam and Kush and Their Historical Implications". Journal of the American Research Center in Egypt. 23: 27–50. doi:10.2307/40001089. JSTOR 40001089.
- "Papyrus - L'Encyclopédie des dessins animés". Toutelatele.com (in French). 2023.
- "Papyrus". Dupuis (in French). 2023.
- Peck, William H. (1999). "Sculpture, production techniques". In Bard, Kathryn A.; Blake Shubert, Steven (eds.). Encyclopedia of the Archeology of Ancient Egypt. New York: Routledge. pp. 874–876. ISBN 978-0-203-98283-9.
- Petrie, William Matthew Flinders (1902). Abydos. Part I. London: The Egypt Exploration Fund. doi:10.11588/diglit.4102. OCLC 1119835355.
- Pierre-Croisiau, Isabelle (2019). Les textes de la pyramide de Mérenrê. Édition, transcription et analyse. Mémoires publiés par les membres de l'institut français d'archéologie du Caire (in French). Paris: Institut Français d'Archéologie Orientale. ISBN 978-2-72-470724-3.
- Ramsey, Christopher Bronk; Dee, Michael W.; Rowland, Joanne M.; Higham, Thomas F. G.; Harris, Stephen A.; Brock, Fiona; Quiles, Anita; Wild, Eva M.; Marcus, Ezra S.; Shortland, Andrew J. (2010). "Radiocarbon-Based Chronology for Dynastic Egypt". Science. New Series. 328 (5985). American Association for the Advancement of Science: 1554–1557. Bibcode:2010Sci...328.1554R. doi:10.1126/science.1189395. JSTOR 40656429. PMID 20558717. S2CID 206526496.
- Redford, Donald B. (1986). "Egypt and Western Asia in the Old Kingdom". Journal of the American Research Center in Egypt. 23: 125–143. doi:10.2307/40001094. JSTOR 40001094.
- Redford, Donald (1992). Egypt, Canaan, and Israel in Ancient Times. Princeton: Princeton University Press. ISBN 978-0-691-03606-9.
- Rice, Michael (1999). Who is Who in Ancient Egypt. London; New York: Routledge. ISBN 978-0-203-44328-6.
- Richards, Janet (2002). "Text and Context in late Old Kingdom Egypt: The Archaeology and Historiography of Weni the Elder". Journal of the American Research Center in Egypt. 39: 75–102. doi:10.2307/40001150. JSTOR 40001150.
- Sayce, Archibald Henry (1893). "Gleanings from the Land of Egypt". Recueil de travaux relatifs à la philologie et à l'archéologie égyptiennes et assyriennes: Pour servir de bulletin à la Mission Française du Caire. 15: 147. doi:10.11588/diglit.12260.
- Sethe, Kurt Heinrich (1903). Urkunden des Alten Reichs (in German). wikipedia entry: Urkunden des Alten Reichs. Leipzig: J.C. Hinrichs. OCLC 846318602.
- Shai, Itzhaq; Greenfield, Haskel J.; Brown, Annie; Albaz, Shira; Maeir, Aren M. (2016). "The Importance of the Donkey as a Pack Animal in the Early Bronze Age Southern Levant: A View from "Tell eṣ-Ṣāfī"/Gath". Zeitschrift des Deutschen Palästina-Vereins. 132 (1). Deutscher verein zur Erforschung Palästinas: 1–25. JSTOR 26602057.
- Shaw, Ian (1999). "Hatnub". In Bard, Kathryn A.; Blake Shubert, Steven (eds.). Encyclopedia of the Archeology of Ancient Egypt. New York: Routledge. pp. 434–436. ISBN 978-0-203-98283-9.
- Shaw, Ian; Nicholson, Paul T. (2008). The Bristish Museum Dictionary of Ancient Egypt. London: British Museum Press. ISBN 978-0-71-411980-9.
- Smith, William Stevenson (1971). "The Old Kingdom of Egypt and the Beginning of the First Intermediate Period". In Edwards, I. E. S.; Gadd, C. J.; Hammond, N. G. L. (eds.). The Cambridge Ancient History, Volume 1, Part 2. Early History of the Middle East (3rd ed.). London, New york: Cambridge University Press. pp. 145–207. ISBN 9780521077910. OCLC 33234410.
- Sowada, Karin N. (2009). Egypt in the Eastern Mediterranean During the Old Kingdom: An Archaeological Perspective. Orbis Biblicus et Orientalis. Vol. 237. Fribourg, Switzerland: Academic Press Fribourg, Vandenhoeck & Ruprecht Göttingen. ISBN 978-3-7278-1649-9.
- Shafik, Sameh (2020). "The provincial policies of Teti, Pepy I and Merenre in Upper Egypt" (PDF). International Journal of Heritage, Tourism and Hospitality. 14 (2): 61–73. doi:10.21608/ijhth.2020.154172. S2CID 234572993.
- Spalinger, Anthony (1994). "Dated Texts of the Old Kingdom". Studien zur Altägyptischen Kultur. 21. Hamburg: Helmut Buske Verlag GmbH: 275–319. JSTOR 25152700.
- "Sphinx of Merenra (A.1984.405)". National Museum of Scotland. National Museums Scotland. 2023.
- "Stele of Meny". MFABoston. Museum of Fine Arts, Boston. 2023.
- Strouhal, Eugene; Vyhnánek, Luboŝ; Gaballah, M. F.; Saunders, S. R.; Woelfli, W.; Nonani, G.; Nêmeĉkovà (2001). "Identification of royal skeletal remains from Egyptian pyramids". Anthropologie (1962–). 39 (1). Moravian Museum: 15–24. JSTOR 26292543.
- Strudwick, Nigel C. (1985a). "Review: Die Rollsiegel des Alten Reiches by Peter Kaplony". The Journal of Egyptian Archaeology. 71. Sage Publications, Ltd.: 27–29. doi:10.2307/3821668. JSTOR 3821668.
- Strudwick, Nigel C. (1985b). The Administration of Egypt in the Old Kingdom: The Highest Titles and Their Holders (PDF). Studies in Egyptology. London; Boston: Kegan Paul International. ISBN 978-0-7103-0107-9.
- Strudwick, Nigel C. (2005). Texts from the Pyramid Age. Writings from the Ancient World (book 16). Atlanta: Society of Biblical Literature. ISBN 978-1-58983-680-8.
- Tiradritti, Francesco; de Luca, Araldo (1999). Egyptian Treasures from the Egyptian Museum in Cairo. New York: Harry Abrams. ISBN 978-0810932760.
- "Tomb-painting". British Museum. 15 April 2023.
- Touring Club Italiano (1993). Firenze e provincia. Guida d'Italia del Touring Club Italiano (in Italian). Milano: Touring Editore. ISBN 978-88-365-0533-3. OCLC 39670817.
- "Vase in the Shape of Mother Monkey with Her Young ca. 2255–2246 B.C." Metropolitan Museum of Art. 14 June 2022.
- "Vase, Merenra". British Museum. 15 April 2023.
- Verner, Miroslav (2001a). "Archaeological Remarks on the 4th and 5th Dynasty Chronology" (PDF). Archiv Orientální. 69 (3): 363–418. ISSN 0044-8699.
- Verner, Miroslav (2001b). "Old Kingdom: An Overview". In Redford, Donald B. (ed.). The Oxford Encyclopedia of Ancient Egypt, Volume 2. Oxford: Oxford University Press. pp. 585–591. ISBN 978-0-19-510234-5.
- Waddell, William Gillan (1971). Manetho. Loeb classical library, 350. Cambridge, Massachusetts; London: Harvard University Press; W. Heinemann. OCLC 6246102.
- Wente, Edward F. (2000). "Review: Chronologie des pharaonischen Ägypten: Die Zeitbestimmung der ägyptischen Geschichte von der Vorzeit bis 332 v. Chr by Jürgen von Beckerath". Journal of Near Eastern Studies. 59 (3): 204–206. doi:10.1086/468836. JSTOR 546258.
- Wildung, Dietrich (1969). Die Rolle ägyptischer Könige im Bewußtsein ihrer Nachwelt. Teil I. Posthume Quellen über die Könige der ersten vier Dynastien. Münchener Ägyptologische Studien (in German). Vol. 17. Berlin: Hessling. OCLC 1151084273.
- Wissa, Myriam (2011). "Jbh3.t in the autobiographical inscription of Weni: developments since 1994". The Journal of Egyptian Archaeology. 97: 223–227. doi:10.1177/030751331109700119. JSTOR 23269902. S2CID 194841287.
- Wright, Mary; Pardee, Dennis (1988). "Literary Sources for the History of Palestine and Syria: Contacts between Egypt and Syro-Palestine during the Old Kingdom". The Biblical Archaeologist. 51 (3). Chicago: The University of Chicago Press on behalf of The American Schools of Oriental Research: 143–161. doi:10.2307/3210065. JSTOR 3210065. S2CID 163985913.
