= Nebet =

- Vizier of Egypt
Egyptian name
nb t
- Tenure: c. 2320 BC
- Pharaoh: Pepi I
- Spouse: Khui
- Children: Ankhesenpepi I; Ankhesenpepi II; Djau

Nebet (“Lady”; fl. c. 2320 BC) was created vizier during the late Old Kingdom of Egypt by King Pepi I of the Sixth Dynasty, who was her son-in-law. As the mother‑in‑law of Pepy I, she was one of the earliest recorded female viziers in ancient Egyptian history. Two other contemporary female viziers were Inenek‑Inti, a wife of Pepy I, and Meritites IV (also known as Meritites II), a daughter of Pepy I. The next female vizier did not appear until the 26th Dynasty.

She was the wife of the nobleman Khui, who was overseer of the Pyramid City.

Her daughters, the Queens Ankhesenpepi I and Ankhesenpepi II were, respectively, the mothers of the Kings Merenre Nemtyemsaf and Pepi II.

Her son Djau, who had a tomb in Abydos became vizier for his nephews, the kings. She is mentioned in his tomb.

Nebet was a contemporary of Weni the Elder.

Her titles include: Hereditary Princess (jrjt-pꜥt), Daughter of Geb (zꜣt Gbb); Countess (ḥwtjꜥ), Daughter of Mrḥw (zꜣt Mrḥw); She of the Curtain (tꜣtjtj), Judge (zꜣb), Vizier (tꜣtj), Daughter of Thoth (zꜣt Ḏḥwty); Companion of the King of Lower Egypt (smrt bjtj), Daughter of Horus (zꜣt Ḥr).

== Sources ==
- Dodson, Aidan; Hilton, Dyan (2004). The Complete Royal Families of Ancient Egypt. London: Thames & Hudson. ISBN 978-0-500-05128-3., pp. 19, 76-77.
