= Igai (deity) =

Ancient egyptian deity

- The deity Igai
Name in hieroglyphs
S40 S40 R12
- Major cult center: Western Desert (Egypt)

Igai was a lesser deity associated with the oases of Egypt's Western Desert, bearing the title “the Lord of the Oasis.” Igai is portrayed in human form, with two was-sceptres that spell out his name on his head.

== Worship ==
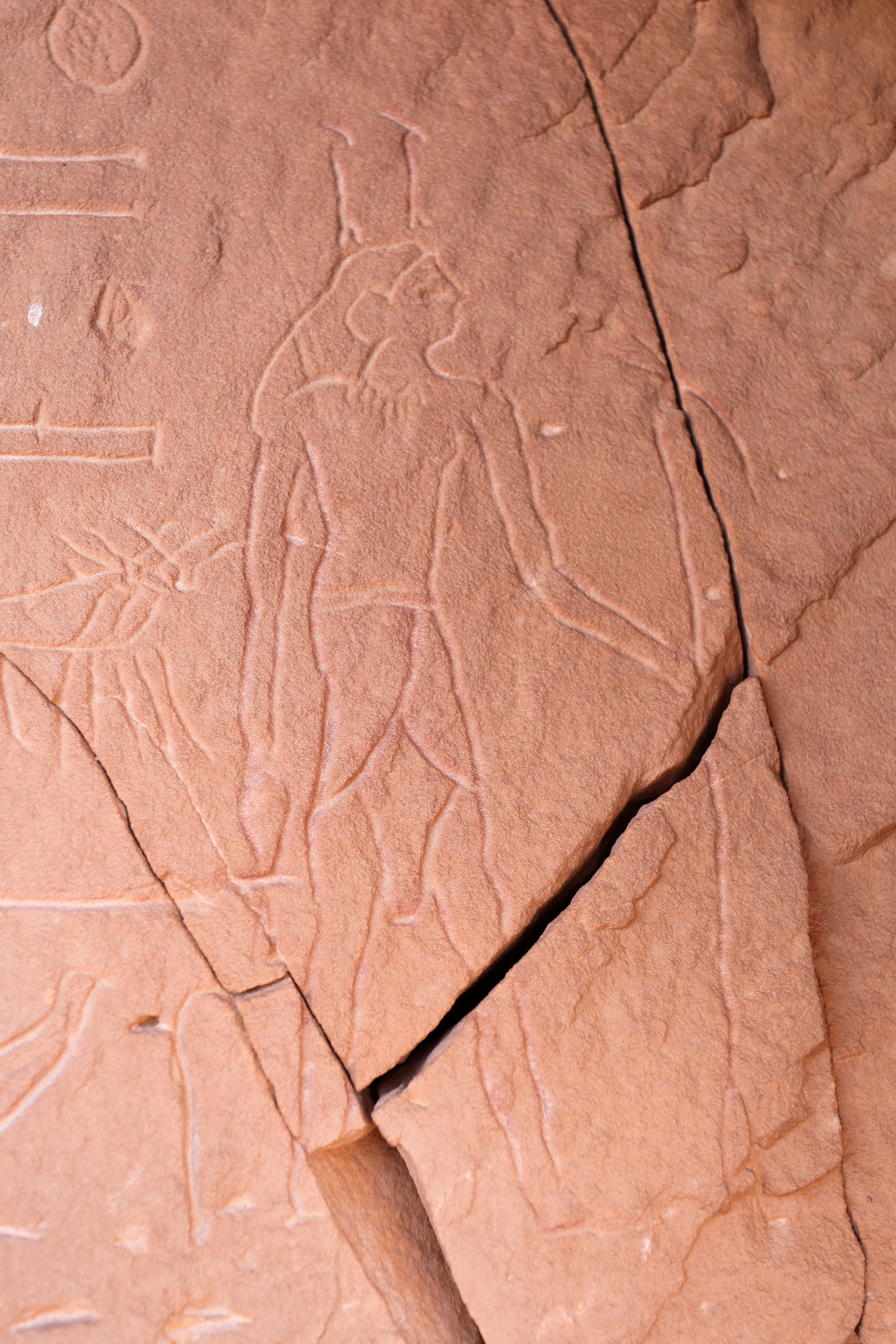
The deity Igai beside the expedition note of Ijj-merjj and Bebi, Water Mountain of Djedefre, New Valley, Western Desert, Egypt

Igai is mentioned in Egyptian sources as early as the Third Dynasty, and was an important god in Dakhleh Oasis during the Old Kingdom. The Middle Kingdom was the golden age of the cult of Igai, providing the great majority of attestations. From the Middle Kingdom onwards, the main urban centre devoted to the cult of the god in the New Valley was the 19th Nome of Upper Egypt.

There are few artefacts documenting the cult of Igai; outside the oases, the name of Igai is written in a graffito from the funerary temple of Niuserre (Fifth Dynasty) at Abusir.

Set and Igai are the only deities identified with the epithet ‘Lord of the Oasis’.

== Other associations ==
The dinosaur Igai semkhu ("Forgotten Lord of the Oasis") is named after Igai; it was discovered in the part of the Egyptian desert now known as the Kharga Oasis, and belongs to the Campanian age of the Late Cretaceous period.

== See also ==
- Ha (deity)

== Bibliography ==
- Henry George Fischer: A God and a General of the Oasis on a Stela of the Late Middle Kingdom. In: Journal of Near Eastern Studies Band 16, Nr. 4, 1957, S. 230–235.
