= Ankhesenpepi III =

Egyptian queen in Sixth Dynasty of Egypt

< p p i i > S34 n Aa1 n s

Queen consort of Egypt
- Tenure: c. 2250 BC
- King: Pepi II
- Burial: Badrashin, Giza, Egypt
- Spouse: Pepi II
- Dynasty: 6th Dynasty
- Father: Nemtyemsaf I

Ankhesenpepi III (fl. c. 2250 BC) was an ancient Egyptian queen of the Sixth Dynasty as a consort of Pepi II, who was probably her uncle. She was a daughter of Nemtyemsaf I and was named after her grandmother, Ankhesenpepi I.

Her titles included: King's Wife (hmt-niswt), King's Daughter (z3t-niswt).

Ankhesenpepi III was buried in a pyramid near that of her grandfather Pepi I. The main part of her sarcophagus was made of sandstone and embedded in the floor of the burial chamber. The lid of the sarcophagus was made of pink granite.

The sarcophagus was unearthed by French Egyptologist Émile Amélineau in 1880.
