= Djau =

Egyptian vizier during the Sixth Dynasty

- Vizier of Egypt
Egyptian name
D a xt w
- Tenure: c. 2290 BC
- Pharaoh: Pepi I
- Burial: Abydos, Egypt
- Father: Khui
- Mother: Nebet

Djau (fl. c. 2290 BC) was a vizier of Upper Egypt during the Sixth Dynasty. He was a member of an influential family from Abydos; his mother was the vizier Nebet, and his father was Khui. His two sisters Ankhesenpepi I and Ankhesenpepi II married King Pepi I. Djau was already in office when his nephew Pepi II became king. He is mentioned in two royal decrees, one from Abydos, the other from Coptos; one of them is dated to Year 11. It is unknown when he died, but when the tomb of Pepi II was decorated, he was no longer vizier. He was buried in Abydos, but the exact location of his tomb is not known.

== Sources ==
- Aidan Dodson & Dyan Hilton: The Complete Royal Families of Ancient Egypt. Thames & Hudson, 2004, ISBN 0-500-05128-3, p. 71-72
- Hans Goedicke: Königliche Dokumente aus dem Alten Reich. Harrassowitz, Wiesbaden 1967 (zu Djaw: S. 84-86)
- Kurt Sethe (Hrsg.): Urkunden des alten Reiches. (Urkunden des ägyptischen Altertums, Band 1) J. C. Hinrichs, Leipzig 1933
