= Janet Richards (Egyptologist) =

American egyptologist

Janet Richards (born 1959) is an American Egyptologist and academic.

== Biography ==
Richards started her higher education at Northwestern University then continued it at Universite de Paris-IV and l'École du Louvre, which led her to her doctorate degree in anthropology and Oriental studies at University of Pennsylvania. Some of her previous occupations were education coordinator at Mount Holyoke College Art Museum, field director for the Pennsylvania-Yale Abydos North Cemetery Project, and curatorial assistant, Egyptian Section at University of Pennsylvania Museum.

Since 1995 Richards has directed the University of Michigan-sponsored Abydos Middle Cemetery Project, which focuses on the funerary remains of the Late and Ptolemaic periods. One of Richards's most defining moments came in 1999 when the expedition located the lost tomb of Weni the Elder, the governor of Upper Egypt. Another outcome of the excavation was to discover how the Old Kingdom cemetery was organized (Richards 1-8).

Since 2012, Richards has been professor of Egyptology and curator for Dynastic Egypt at the University of Michigan-Ann Arbor. Richards is the author of "Society and Death in Ancient Egypt: Mortuary Landscapes of the Middle Kingdom" (Cambridge, 2005). She is also co-editor with Mary van Buren of “Order, Legitimacy and Wealth in Ancient States” (Richards 1-5). In 2013, she was awarded a Berlin Prize by the American Academy of Berlin.

== Publications ==
- Richards, Janet (2000), "Weni the Elder and His Mortuary Neighborhood at Abydos, Egypt", Kelsey Museum Newsletter.
- Society and Death in Ancient Egypt: Mortuary Landscapes of the Middle Kingdom. Cambridge University Press, 2005 (Paperback edition, 2009).
