= Ankhesenpepi II =

Egyptian queen consort

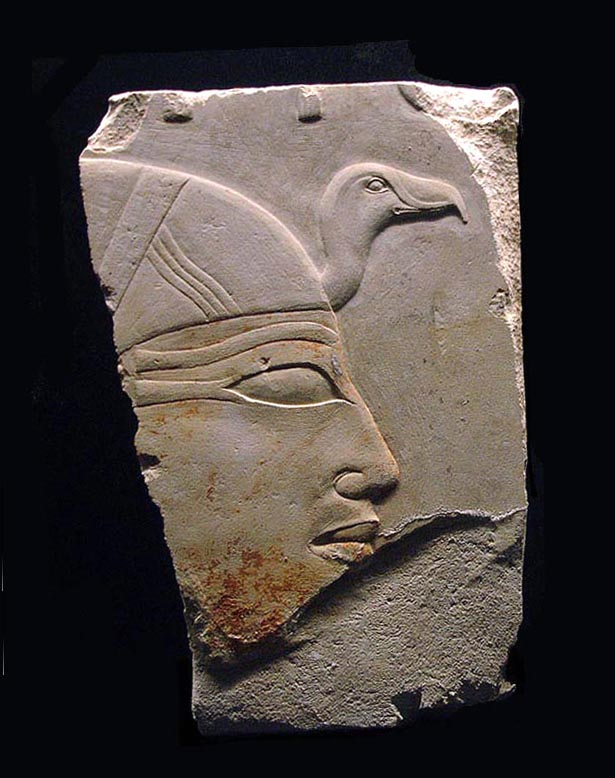
- Profile of Ankhnespepy II from her funerary temple

Queen consort of Egypt
- Tenure: c. 2310 BC
- King: Pepi I Nemtyemsaf I
- Burial: Badrashin, Giza, Egypt
- Spouse: Pepi I Nemtyemsaf I
- Issue: Pepi II
Egyptian name
< p p i i > anx n x n sꜤḫ n=s ppj
- Dynasty: 6th Dynasty
- Father: Khui
- Mother: Nebet

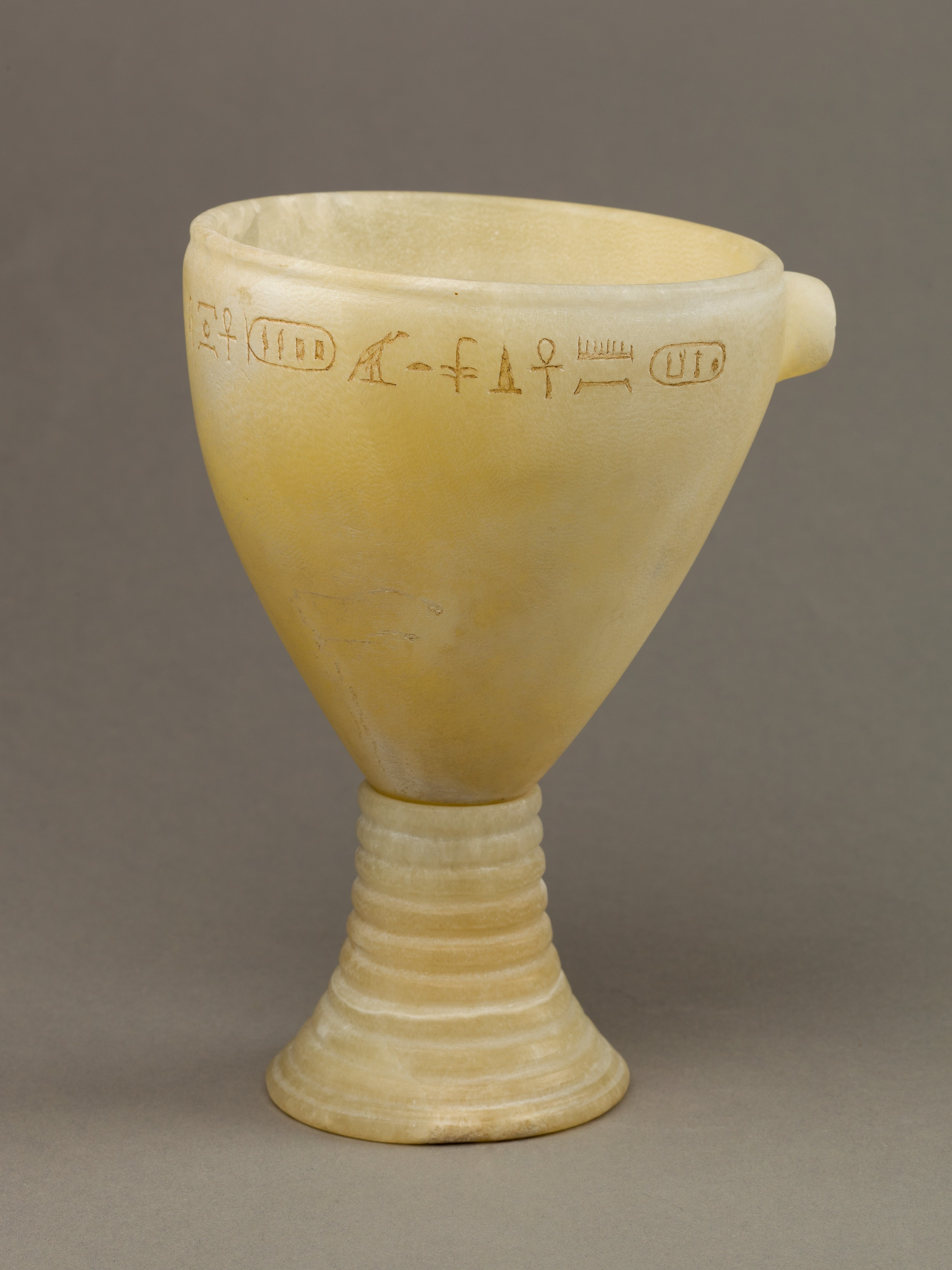
Brewer's Vat of Queen Mother Ankhenesnpepi II

Ankhesenpepi II or Ankhesenmeryre II (fl. c. 2310 BC) was a queen consort during the Sixth Dynasty of Egypt. She was the wife of Kings Pepi I and Nemtyemsaf I, and the mother of Pepi II. She likely served as regent during the minority of her son. She was buried in a pyramid in Saqqara.

== Biography ==
Ankhesenpepi II was the daughter of Khui and the vizier Nebet. Her sister Ankhesenpepi I was also married to King Pepi I and her brother Djau served as vizier.

Both Ankhesenpepi II and her sister Ankhesenpepi I were married to King Pepi I whose throne name was Meryre; their name was taken when the marriage took place, since it means "Her life belongs to Pepi/Meryre". Both queens gave birth to the kings: the son of Ankhesenpepi I was Nemtyemsaf I, who ruled only for a few years; the son of Ankhesenpepi II was Pepi II, who succeeded after Nemtyemsaf's death. Pepi II was a young boy when he succeeded to the throne. There are indications that Ankhesenpepi II served as a regent for her son in those early years of his reign. A statue which shows her with her son on her lap (now in Brooklyn) shows the queen much larger in size than her son. Some have interpreted this statue as Ankhesenpepi II and her son Pepi II assuming the roles of the goddess Isis and her son Horus.

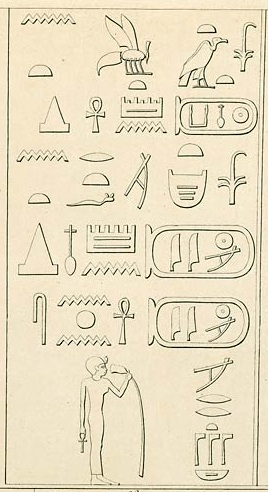
Ankhesenpepi (II) as depicted at Wadi Maghara (Sinai)

She is also mentioned together with her sister on their brother's stela in Abydos, at her pyramid and in that of her daughter-in-law Neith. She further appears in a decree in Abydos. She is depicted in the Sinai, where she is shown equal in size to her son.

== Royal titles of Ankhesenpepi II ==
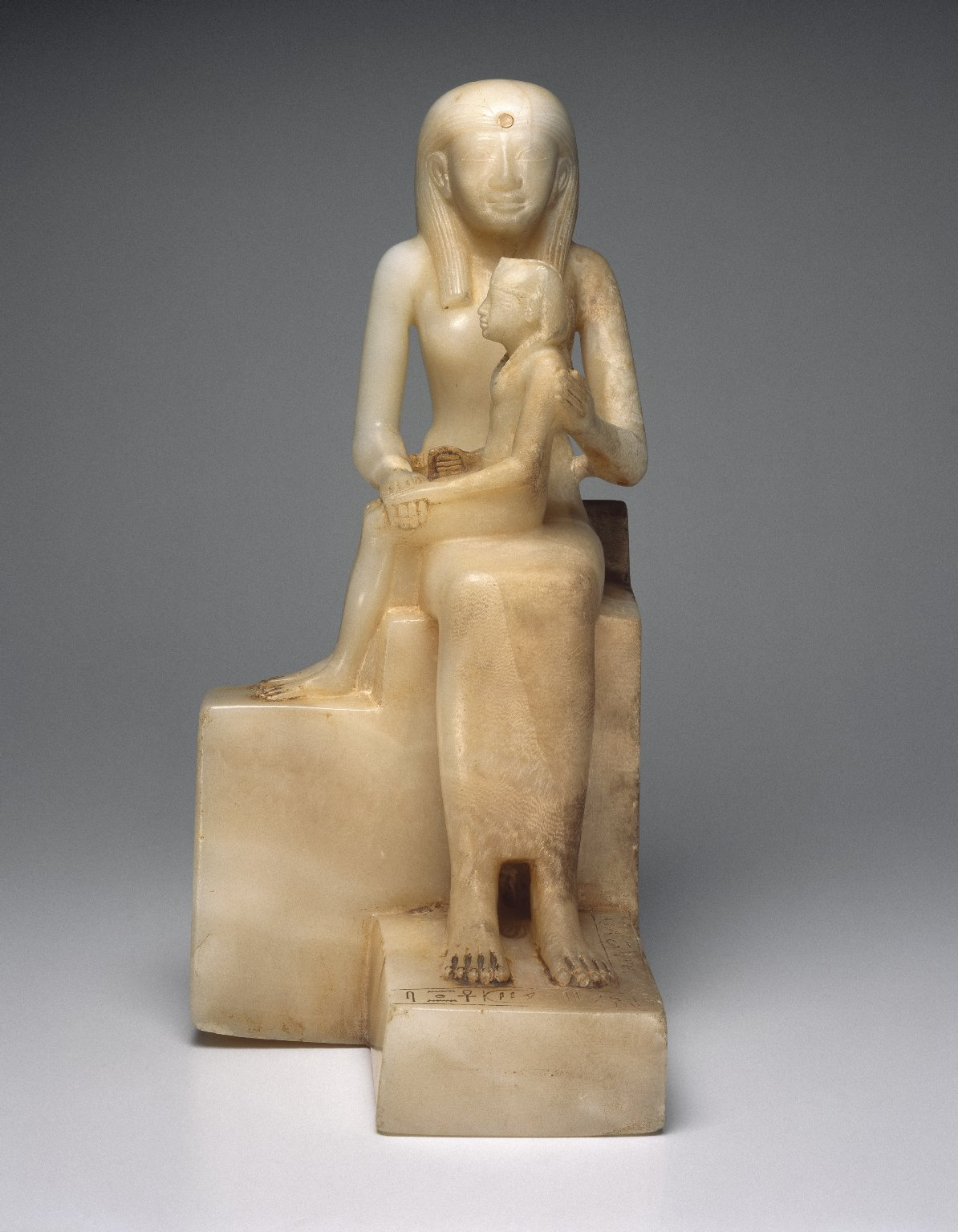
Statuette of Queen Ankhesenpepi II and her son, Pepi II, c. 2288–2224 or 2194 BC. Egyptian alabaster, Brooklyn Museum.

Her titles as queen were: Great one of the hetes-sceptre (wrt-hetes), She who sees Horus and Seth (m33t-hrw-stsh), Great of Praises (wrt-hzwt), King's Wife of Mennefer-Meryre (hmt-niswt-mn-nfr-mry-r`), King's Wife, his beloved (hmt-nisw meryt.f), God's Daughter (s3t-ntr), This Daughter of a God (s3t-ntr-wt), Attendant of the Great One (khtt-wr), Companion of Horus (tist-hrw), Companion of Horus (smrt-hrw). However, it is now known that she was also the chief queen of Merenre after the death of Pepi I, her first husband. In 1999 and 2000, excavation work at her Saqqara funerary temple uncovered several stone blocks inscribed with a previously unknown royal title for her:

"[The] King's Wife of the Pyramid of Pepy I, King's Wife of the Pyramid of Merenre, King's Mother of the Pyramid of Pepy II."

Since the temple was constructed under Pepi II because it makes a reference to king Pepi II, this shows that Merenre married Queen Ankhesenpepi II after Pepi I died. Merenre was Ankhesenpepi II's nephew. As the South Saqqara Stone document, an annal document created under Pepi II, shows that no period of coregency existed under Pepi I and Merenre, this suggests that Merenre and Ankhesenpepi II were rather the parents of Pepi II (rather than Pepi I) particularly since this document also assigns Merenre an independent reign of about a decade to Merenre.

After her son Pepi came to the throne, Ankhesenpepi added the titles Mother of the Dual King Men-ankh-Neferkare (mwt-niswt-biti-mn-kh`-nfr-k3-r`), King's Mother of Men-ankh-Neferkare (mwt-niswt- mn-kh`-nfr-k3-r`), and King's Mother (mwt-niswt).

== Death and burial ==
Ankhesenpepi II's pyramid in Saqqara was found and excavated in 1998. The finds show that Ankhesenpepi's pyramid contained the first known examples of the pyramid texts in a Queen's pyramid. The texts in the burial chamber refer to her as a queen mother, hence the construction of her pyramid dates to the reign of her son.

Inside the burial chamber were human remains which could be those of the queen. The burial was disturbed and the mummy found in and near the sarcophagus was incomplete. The bones belong to a middle aged woman. Next her pyramid were also found the remains of an obelisk. It is one of the largest of the Old Kingdom.
