= Ankhesenpepi I =

< p p i i > S34 n Aa1 n s

Queen consort of Egypt
- King: Pepi I
- Spouse: Pepi I
- Issue: Merenre Nemtyemsaf I
- Father: Khui
- Mother: Nebet
- Religion: Ancient Egyptian religion

Ankhesenpepi I (also Ankhenespepi I or Ankhenesmeryre I) was a queen consort during the Sixth Dynasty of Egypt.

== Biography ==
Ankhesenpepi was a daughter of the female vizier Nebet and her husband Khui, nomarch of Abydos. Ankhesenpepi's sister was Ankhenespepi II, and her brother was Vizier Djau.

Both sisters – Ankhesenpepi I and II – were married to Pharaoh Pepi I whose throne name was Meryre; their name was probably taken when the marriage took place, since it means "Her life belongs to Pepi/Meryre". Both queens gave birth to successors of Pepi: the son of Ankhesenpepi I was Merenre Nemtyemsaf I, who ruled only for a few years; the son of Ankhenespepi II was Pepi II, who succeeded after Nemtyemsaf's death.

She is mentioned together with her sister on their brother's stela in Abydos, also, at her pyramid, on an inscription now in Berlin, and a decree in Abydos.

Her titles were: King's Wife, King's Mother, Great of Sceptre.

== See also ==
- South Saqqara Stone
