= Henry George Fischer =

American Egyptologist and poet (1923 – 2006)

- Born: May 10, 1923; Philadelphia
- Died: January 11, 2006 (aged 82); Newtown Township, Delaware County, Pennsylvania
- Spouse: Eleanor Teel Fischer

Henry George Fischer (May 10, 1923 – January 11, 2006) was an American Egyptologist and poet.

== Biography ==
Born on May 10, 1923, in Philadelphia, Fischer graduated from Princeton University in 1945, after that he was sent teaching English at the American University of Beirut. Returned in the USA, he became an assistant at the University of Pennsylvania Museum and in 1955 he received a Ph.D. from the same university. Shortly after he joined an expedition to Egypt and later he became an assistant professor of Egyptology at Yale University.
In 1958 he started working as an assistant curator at the New York Metropolitan Museum of Art, forming a bond with this place that will last for his entire life. In 1963 he became associate curator and in 1964, head of the Department of Egyptology. Since the same year until 1970 Fischer was a member of the committee for the salvage of Abu Simbel temples from being submerged by the Lake Nasser following construction of the Aswan Dam: the small temple of Dendur, which was donated to the United States in 1965 as a gratitude for its efforts, was originally intended to be reconstructed on the banks of the Potomac or the Charles River, but Fischer persuaded the presidential committee that such a placement would have exposed the sandstone blocks to excessive degradation, and the temple was reconstructed and exhibited in the Metropolitan Museum since 1978. In 1970 Fischer was awarded by the museum patron Lila Acheson Wallace, earning a special chair as the curator of Egyptology. When he retired in 1992, he became a curator emeritus.

Fischer's fields of interest were the arts and culture of the ancient Egyptian nomoi (provinces) and their differences, as well as the Metropolitan Museum collection and the hieroglyphic writing system (his influential work The Orientation of Hieroglyphs). After his retirement he focused on his other interests, such as writing poetry and playing the Renaissance sackbut.

Henry George Fischer died on January 11, 2006, in Newtown Township, Delaware County, Pennsylvania, aged 82.

== Significant works ==
- 1968 - Ancient Egyptian representations of turtles. The Metropolitan Museum of Art, New York NY
- 1968 - Dendera in the Third Millennium B.C. Down to the Theban Domination of Upper Egypt. Locust Valley, The Metropolitan Museum of Art, New York NY
- 1976 - Ancient Egyptian epigraphy and palaeography. The Metropolitan Museum of Art, New York NY
- 1976 - Egyptian Studies I: Varia I. The Metropolitan Museum of Art, New York NY
- 1977 - Egyptian Studies II: The Orientation of Hieroglyphs. Part I. Reversals The Metropolitan Museum of Art, New York NY
- 1984 - The Renaissance sackbut and its use today. The Metropolitan Museum of Art, New York NY
- 1985 - Egyptian titles of the Middle Kingdom. A supplement to Wm. Ward's index. The Metropolitan Museum of Art, New York NY
- 1986 - L'écriture et l'art de l'Egypte ancienne. Quatre leçons sur la paléographie et l'épigraphie ancienne., Presses universitaires de France, Paris
- 1989 - Egyptian women of the Old Kingdom and of the Heracleopolitan period. The Metropolitan Museum of Art, New York NY
- 1993 - Timely Rhymes (poetry collection)
- 1993 – More Timely Rhymes (poetry collection)
- 1996 - The tomb of I̕p at El Ṣaff. The Metropolitan Museum of Art, New York NY
- 1996 - Varia nova. The Metropolitan Museum of Art, New York NY
- 1998 - Night and Light and the Half-Light (poetry collection)
- 1999 - Ancient Egyptian Calligraphy, A Beginner´s Guide to Writing Hieroglyphs. The Metropolitan Museum of Art, New York NY
- 2002 - Small Ponderings (poetry collection)
