= Leuconitocris nigricornis =

Scientific classification
- Kingdom: Animalia
- Phylum: Arthropoda
- Clade: Pancrustacea
- Class: Insecta
- Order: Coleoptera
- Suborder: Polyphaga
- Infraorder: Cucujiformia
- Family: Cerambycidae
- Genus: Leuconitocris
- Species: L. nigricornis

Binomial name
- Leuconitocris nigricornis (Olivier, 1795)

Synonyms
- Oberea alessandrini Bertoloni, 1855; Dirphya nigricornis (Olivier, 1795); Necydalis nigricornis Olivier, 1795; Nitocris nigricornis (Olivier, 1795); Nitocris fulvotarsata Aurivillius, 1908; Nitocris abdominalis Fahraeus, 1872

Species of beetle

Leuconitocris nigricornis is a species of beetle in the family Cerambycidae. It was described by Guillaume-Antoine Olivier in 1795, originally under the genus Necydalis. It is known from Tanzania, South Africa, the Central African Republic, Mozambique, Uganda, Malawi, and Zambia.

== Subspecies ==
- Leuconitocris nigricornis mabokensis Breuning, 1981
- Leuconitocris nigricornis usambica (Kolbe, 1911)
- Leuconitocris nigricornis nigricornis (Olivier, 1795)
