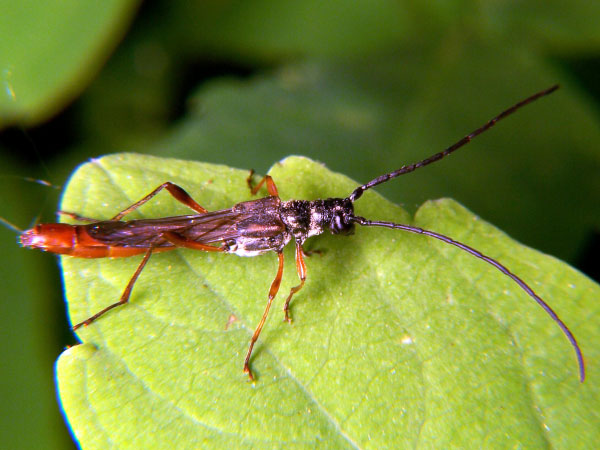
- Necydalis mellita

Scientific classification
- Kingdom: Animalia
- Phylum: Arthropoda
- Class: Insecta
- Order: Coleoptera
- Suborder: Polyphaga
- Infraorder: Cucujiformia
- Family: Cerambycidae
- Subfamily: Necydalinae; Latreille, 1825

Genera
- See text

= Necydalinae =

Subfamily of beetles

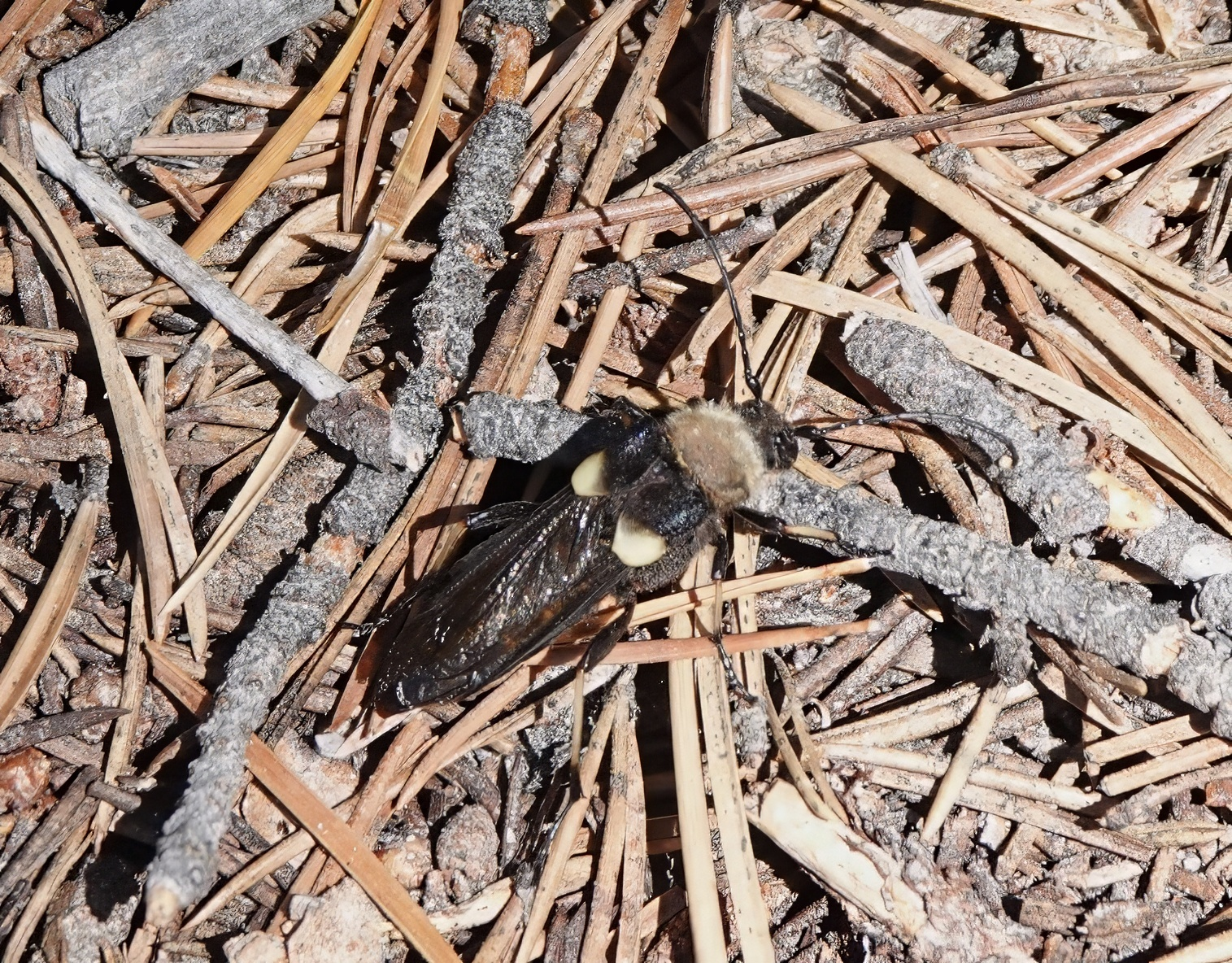
Ulochaetes leoninus, California

Necydalinae is a small subfamily of the longhorn beetle family (Cerambycidae), historically treated as a tribe within the subfamily Lepturinae, but recently recognized as a separate subfamily. These beetles are unusual for cerambycids, in that the elytra are quite short; they are thus rather similar in appearance to rove beetles, though most are actually bee or wasp mimics.

== Genera ==
These two genera belong to the subfamily Necydalinae:

- Necydalis Linné, 1758 (Europe, Asia, North America)
- Ulochaetes LeConte, 1854 (western North America)
