= Leuconitocris atriceps =

Scientific classification
- Kingdom: Animalia
- Phylum: Arthropoda
- Class: Insecta
- Order: Coleoptera
- Suborder: Polyphaga
- Infraorder: Cucujiformia
- Family: Cerambycidae
- Genus: Leuconitocris
- Species: L. atriceps

Binomial name
- Leuconitocris atriceps (Breuning, 1956)

Synonyms
- Dirphya atriceps (Breuning, 1956)

Species of beetle

Leuconitocris atriceps is a species of beetle in the family Cerambycidae. It was described by Stephan von Breuning in 1956.
