= Leuconitocris subjuvenca =

Scientific classification
- Kingdom: Animalia
- Phylum: Arthropoda
- Class: Insecta
- Order: Coleoptera
- Suborder: Polyphaga
- Infraorder: Cucujiformia
- Family: Cerambycidae
- Genus: Leuconitocris
- Species: L. subjuvenca

Binomial name
- Leuconitocris subjuvenca (Breuning, 1950)

Synonyms
- Dirphya subjuvenca (Breuning, 1950)

Species of beetle

Leuconitocris subjuvenca is a species of beetle in the family of Cerambycidae. It was first described by Stephan von Breuning in 1950.
