= Leuconitocris obereoides =

Scientific classification
- Kingdom: Animalia
- Phylum: Arthropoda
- Class: Insecta
- Order: Coleoptera
- Suborder: Polyphaga
- Infraorder: Cucujiformia
- Family: Cerambycidae
- Genus: Leuconitocris
- Species: L. obereoides

Binomial name
- Leuconitocris obereoides (Breuning, 1956)

Synonyms
- Dirphya obereoides (Breuning, 1956)

Species of beetle

Leuconitocris obereoides is a species of beetle in the family Cerambycidae. It was described by Stephan von Breuning in 1956.

== Subspecies ==
- Dirphya obereoides obereoides (Breuning, 1956)
- Dirphya obereoides zambicola Téocchi, Jiroux & Sudre, 2004
