= Ulochaetes leoninus =

Scientific classification
- Kingdom: Animalia
- Phylum: Arthropoda
- Class: Insecta
- Order: Coleoptera
- Suborder: Polyphaga
- Infraorder: Cucujiformia
- Family: Cerambycidae
- Genus: Ulochaetes
- Species: U. leoninus

Binomial name
- Ulochaetes leoninus LeConte, 1854

Species of beetle

Ulochaetes leoninus, the lion beetle, is a species of long-horned beetle in the family Cerambycidae. It is found in North America.
