= Leuconitocris sessensis =

Scientific classification
- Kingdom: Animalia
- Phylum: Arthropoda
- Class: Insecta
- Order: Coleoptera
- Suborder: Polyphaga
- Infraorder: Cucujiformia
- Family: Cerambycidae
- Genus: Leuconitocris
- Species: L. sessensis

Binomial name
- Leuconitocris sessensis (Breuning, 1956)

Synonyms
- Dirphya sessensis (Breuning, 1956)

Species of beetle

Leuconitocris sessensis is a species of beetle in the family Cerambycidae. It was described by Stephan von Breuning in 1956.

== Subspecies ==
- Dirphya sessensis intermedia Breuning, 1976
- Dirphya sessensis katangensis Breuning, 1970
- Dirphya sessensis sessensis (Breuning, 1956)
