= Leuconitocris angustifrons =

Scientific classification
- Domain: Eukaryota
- Kingdom: Animalia
- Phylum: Arthropoda
- Class: Insecta
- Order: Coleoptera
- Suborder: Polyphaga
- Infraorder: Cucujiformia
- Family: Cerambycidae
- Genus: Leuconitocris
- Species: L. angustifrons

Binomial name
- Leuconitocris angustifrons (Harold, 1878)

Synonyms
- Dirphya angustifrons Harold, 1878

Species of beetle

Leuconitocris angustifrons is a species of beetle in the family Cerambycidae. It was described by Harold in 1878.
