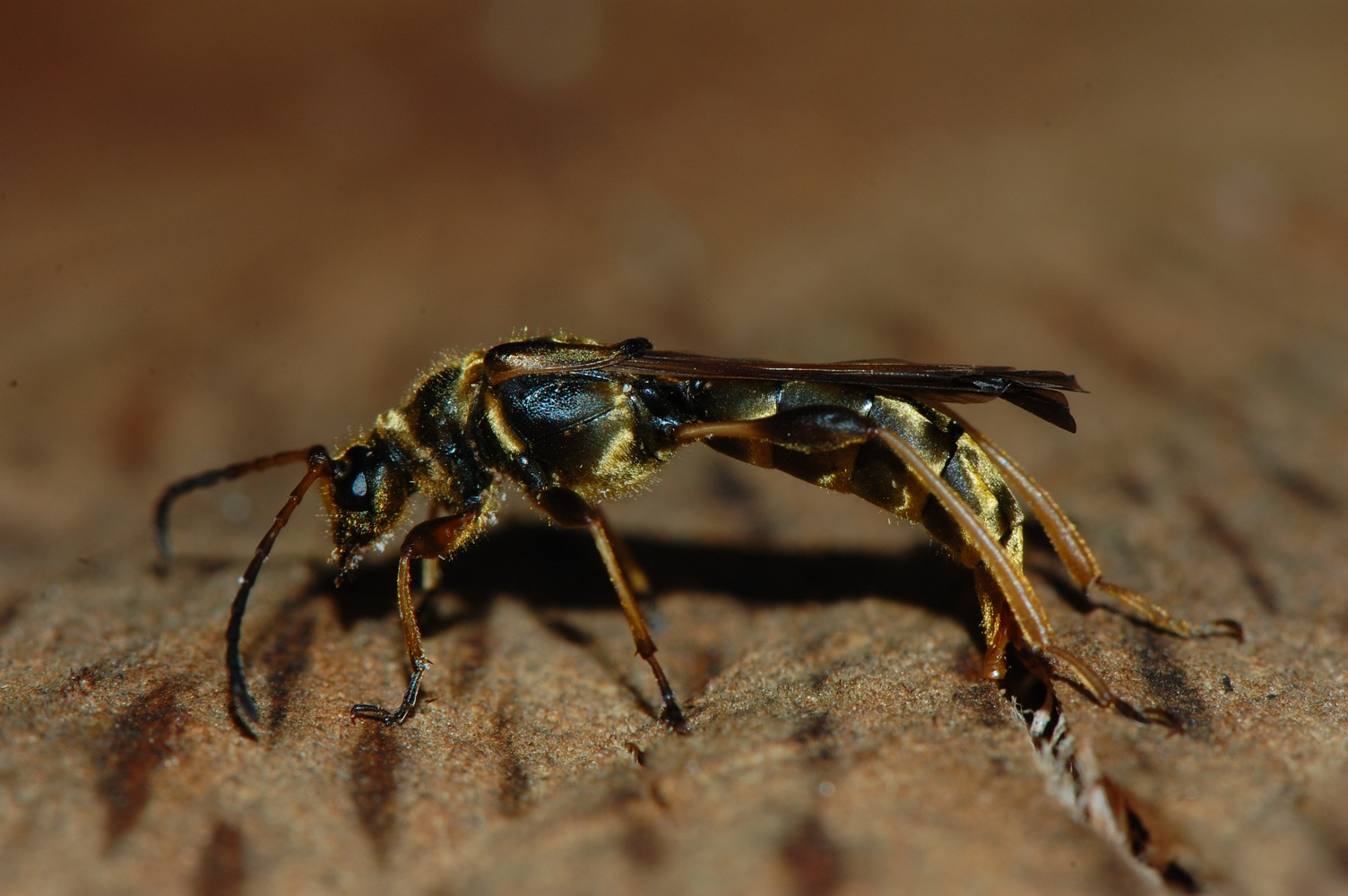

Scientific classification
- Kingdom: Animalia
- Phylum: Arthropoda
- Class: Insecta
- Order: Coleoptera
- Suborder: Polyphaga
- Infraorder: Cucujiformia
- Family: Cerambycidae
- Genus: Necydalis
- Species: N. cavipennis

Binomial name
- Necydalis cavipennis LeConte, 1873

= Necydalis cavipennis =

Species of beetle

Necydalis cavipennis is a species of long-horned beetle in the family Cerambycidae. It is found in Central America and North America.
