= Leuconitocris schoutedeni =

Scientific classification
- Kingdom: Animalia
- Phylum: Arthropoda
- Class: Insecta
- Order: Coleoptera
- Suborder: Polyphaga
- Infraorder: Cucujiformia
- Family: Cerambycidae
- Genus: Leuconitocris
- Species: L. schoutedeni

Binomial name
- Leuconitocris schoutedeni (Breuning, 1951)

Synonyms
- Dirphya schoutedeni (Breuning, 1951)

Species of beetle

Leuconitocris schoutedeni is a species of beetle in the family Cerambycidae. It was described by Stephan von Breuning in 1951.
