= Leuconitocris nigriceps =

Scientific classification
- Domain: Eukaryota
- Kingdom: Animalia
- Phylum: Arthropoda
- Class: Insecta
- Order: Coleoptera
- Suborder: Polyphaga
- Infraorder: Cucujiformia
- Family: Cerambycidae
- Genus: Leuconitocris
- Species: L. nigriceps

Binomial name
- Leuconitocris nigriceps (Aurivillius, 1914)

Synonyms
- Dirphya nigriceps Aurivillius, 1914; Dirphya nigriceps m. infuscata Teocchi, 2000

Species of beetle

Leuconitocris nigriceps is a species of beetle in the family Cerambycidae. It was described by Per Olof Christopher Aurivillius in 1914.
