= Leuconitocris delecta =

Scientific classification
- Domain: Eukaryota
- Kingdom: Animalia
- Phylum: Arthropoda
- Class: Insecta
- Order: Coleoptera
- Suborder: Polyphaga
- Infraorder: Cucujiformia
- Family: Cerambycidae
- Genus: Leuconitocris
- Species: L. delecta

Binomial name
- Leuconitocris delecta (Gahan, 1909)

Synonyms
- Nitocris delecta (Gahan, 1909); Nitakeris (Cicatronitocris) delecta (Gahan, 1909); Dirphya delecta Gahan, 1909; Nitocris delecta m. rufoscapula Téocchi, 1990

Species of beetle

Leuconitocris delecta is a species of beetle in the family Cerambycidae. It was described by Charles Joseph Gahan in 1909. It is known from the Republic of the Congo, the Democratic Republic of the Congo, the Central African Republic, Kenya, and Uganda. It contains the varietas Leuconitocris delecta var. nigripennis.
