= Leuconitocris murphyi =

Scientific classification
- Domain: Eukaryota
- Kingdom: Animalia
- Phylum: Arthropoda
- Class: Insecta
- Order: Coleoptera
- Suborder: Polyphaga
- Infraorder: Cucujiformia
- Family: Cerambycidae
- Genus: Leuconitocris
- Species: L. murphyi

Binomial name
- Leuconitocris murphyi (Sudre & Téocchi, 2005)

Synonyms
- Dirphya murphyi Sudre & Téocchi, 2005

Species of beetle

Leuconitocris murphyi is a species of beetle in the family Cerambycidae. It was described by Jérôme Sudre and Pierre Téocchi in 2005. It is known from Malawi.
