= Leuconitocris fuscofasciata =

Scientific classification
- Kingdom: Animalia
- Phylum: Arthropoda
- Class: Insecta
- Order: Coleoptera
- Suborder: Polyphaga
- Infraorder: Cucujiformia
- Family: Cerambycidae
- Genus: Leuconitocris
- Species: L. fuscofasciata

Binomial name
- Leuconitocris fuscofasciata (Breuning & Téocchi, 1978)

Synonyms
- Dirphya fuscofasciata (Breuning & Téocchi, 1978)

Species of beetle

Leuconitocris fuscofasciata is a species of beetle in the family Cerambycidae. It was described by Stephan von Breuning and Pierre Téocchi in 1978.
