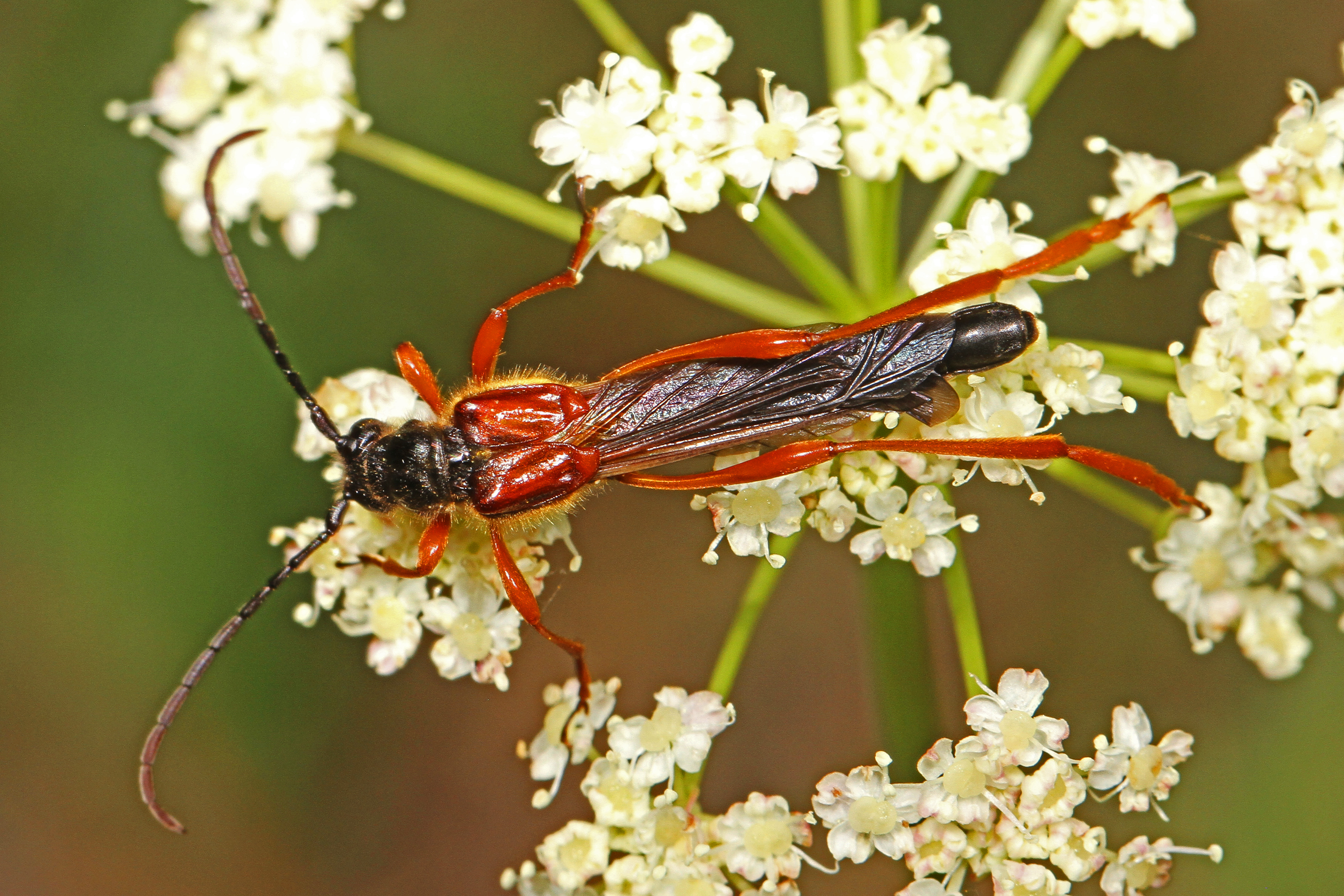

Scientific classification
- Domain: Eukaryota
- Kingdom: Animalia
- Phylum: Arthropoda
- Class: Insecta
- Order: Coleoptera
- Suborder: Polyphaga
- Infraorder: Cucujiformia
- Family: Cerambycidae
- Genus: Necydalis
- Species: N. diversicollis

Binomial name
- Necydalis diversicollis Schaeffer, 1932

= Necydalis diversicollis =

Species of beetle

Necydalis diversicollis is a species of long-horned beetle in the family Cerambycidae. It is found in North America.

== Subspecies ==
These two subspecies belong to the species Necydalis diversicollis:

- Necydalis diversicollis californica Linsley, 1940
- Necydalis diversicollis diversicollis Schaeffer, 1932
