= Leuconitocris minor =

Scientific classification
- Kingdom: Animalia
- Phylum: Arthropoda
- Class: Insecta
- Order: Coleoptera
- Suborder: Polyphaga
- Infraorder: Cucujiformia
- Family: Cerambycidae
- Genus: Leuconitocris
- Species: L. minor

Binomial name
- Leuconitocris minor (Breuning, 1956)

Synonyms
- Dirphya minor (Breuning, 1956)

Species of beetle

Leuconitocris minor is a species of beetle in the family Cerambycidae. It was described by Stephan von Breuning in 1956.
