= Leuconitocris argenteovittata =

Scientific classification
- Domain: Eukaryota
- Kingdom: Animalia
- Phylum: Arthropoda
- Class: Insecta
- Order: Coleoptera
- Suborder: Polyphaga
- Infraorder: Cucujiformia
- Family: Cerambycidae
- Genus: Leuconitocris
- Species: L. argenteovittata

Binomial name
- Leuconitocris argenteovittata (Aurivillius, 1914)

Synonyms
- Dirphya argenteovittata Aurivillius, 1914; Nitocris argenteovitttata (Aurivillius) Breuning, 1950

Species of beetle

Leuconitocris argenteovittata is a species of beetle in the family Cerambycidae. It was described by Per Olof Christopher Aurivillius in 1914.

== Subspecies ==
- Leuconitocris argenteovittata argenteovittata (Aurivillius, 1914)
- Leuconitocris argenteovittata fuscicornis (Breuning, 1950)
