= Necydalis laevicollis =

Scientific classification
- Domain: Eukaryota
- Kingdom: Animalia
- Phylum: Arthropoda
- Class: Insecta
- Order: Coleoptera
- Suborder: Polyphaga
- Infraorder: Cucujiformia
- Family: Cerambycidae
- Genus: Necydalis
- Species: N. laevicollis

Binomial name
- Necydalis laevicollis LeConte, 1869

Synonyms
- Necydalis laevicollis seminiger Linsley, 1940

Species of beetle

Necydalis laevicollis is a species of long-horned beetle in the family Cerambycidae. It is found in North America.
