= Leuconitocris gigantea =

Scientific classification
- Kingdom: Animalia
- Phylum: Arthropoda
- Class: Insecta
- Order: Coleoptera
- Suborder: Polyphaga
- Infraorder: Cucujiformia
- Family: Cerambycidae
- Genus: Leuconitocris
- Species: L. gigantea

Binomial name
- Leuconitocris gigantea (Nonfried, 1892)

Synonyms
- Nitocris gigantea Nonfried, 1892; Dirphya gigantea (Nonfried)

Species of beetle

Leuconitocris gigantea is a species of beetle in the family Cerambycidae. It was described by Nonfried in 1892.
