= Leuconitocris senegalensis =

Scientific classification
- Domain: Eukaryota
- Kingdom: Animalia
- Phylum: Arthropoda
- Class: Insecta
- Order: Coleoptera
- Suborder: Polyphaga
- Infraorder: Cucujiformia
- Family: Cerambycidae
- Genus: Leuconitocris
- Species: L. senegalensis

Binomial name
- Leuconitocris senegalensis (Audinet-Serville, 1835)

Synonyms
- Nitakeris (Cicatronitocris) senegalensis (Audinet-Serville) Téocchi, Sudre & Jiroux, 2010; Dirphya senegalensis (Audinet-Serville, 1835)

Species of beetle

Leuconitocris senegalensis is a species of beetle in the family Cerambycidae. It was described by Audinet-Serville in 1835.
