= Leuconitocris microphthalma =

Scientific classification
- Kingdom: Animalia
- Phylum: Arthropoda
- Clade: Pancrustacea
- Class: Insecta
- Order: Coleoptera
- Suborder: Polyphaga
- Infraorder: Cucujiformia
- Family: Cerambycidae
- Genus: Leuconitocris
- Species: L. microphthalma

Binomial name
- Leuconitocris microphthalma (Breuning, 1950)

Synonyms
- Nitocris microphthalma Breuning, 1950; Nitocris microphtalma m. duttoi Teocchi, 1992; Nitocris sutureaurea Breuning, 1950; Dirphya microphthalma (Breuning, 1950)

Species of beetle

Leuconitocris microphthalma is a species of beetle in the family Cerambycidae. It was described by Stephan von Breuning in 1950, originally under the genus Nitocris. It is known from Sierra Leone and the Democratic Republic of the Congo.

== Subspecies ==
- Leuconitocris microphthalma microphthalma (Breuning, 1950)
- Leuconitocris microphthalma rossii (Téocchi, 1992)
