= Leuconitocris major =

Scientific classification
- Kingdom: Animalia
- Phylum: Arthropoda
- Class: Insecta
- Order: Coleoptera
- Suborder: Polyphaga
- Infraorder: Cucujiformia
- Family: Cerambycidae
- Genus: Leuconitocris
- Species: L. major

Binomial name
- Leuconitocris major (Breuning, 1956)

Synonyms
- Dirphya major (Breuning, 1956)

Species of beetle

Leuconitocris major is a species of beetle in the family Cerambycidae. It was described by Stephan von Breuning in 1956.

== Subspecies ==
- Dirphya major major (Breuning, 1956)
- Dirphya major rhodesiana Breuning, 1972
- Dirphya major nigrotibialis (Lepesme & Breuning, 1953)
