= Necydalis rudei =

Scientific classification
- Domain: Eukaryota
- Kingdom: Animalia
- Phylum: Arthropoda
- Class: Insecta
- Order: Coleoptera
- Suborder: Polyphaga
- Infraorder: Cucujiformia
- Family: Cerambycidae
- Genus: Necydalis
- Species: N. rudei

Binomial name
- Necydalis rudei Linsley & Chemsak, 1972

Species of beetle

Necydalis rudei is a species of long-horned beetle in the family Cerambycidae. It is found in North America.
