= Leuconitocris bimaculata =

Scientific classification
- Domain: Eukaryota
- Kingdom: Animalia
- Phylum: Arthropoda
- Class: Insecta
- Order: Coleoptera
- Suborder: Polyphaga
- Infraorder: Cucujiformia
- Family: Cerambycidae
- Genus: Leuconitocris
- Species: L. bimaculata

Binomial name
- Leuconitocris bimaculata (Franz, 1942)

Synonyms
- Dirphya bimaculata (Franz, 1942)

Species of beetle

Leuconitocris bimaculata is a species of beetle in the family Cerambycidae. It was described by Franz in 1942.
