= Leuconitocris similis =

Scientific classification
- Domain: Eukaryota
- Kingdom: Animalia
- Phylum: Arthropoda
- Class: Insecta
- Order: Coleoptera
- Suborder: Polyphaga
- Infraorder: Cucujiformia
- Family: Cerambycidae
- Genus: Leuconitocris
- Species: L. similis

Binomial name
- Leuconitocris similis (Gahan, 1894)

Synonyms
- Dirphya similis Gahan, 1894

Species of beetle

Leuconitocris similis is a species of beetle in the family Cerambycidae. It was described by Charles Joseph Gahan in 1894.
