= Leuconitocris patricia =

Scientific classification
- Domain: Eukaryota
- Kingdom: Animalia
- Phylum: Arthropoda
- Class: Insecta
- Order: Coleoptera
- Suborder: Polyphaga
- Infraorder: Cucujiformia
- Family: Cerambycidae
- Genus: Leuconitocris
- Species: L. patricia

Binomial name
- Leuconitocris patricia (Chevrolat, 1858)

Synonyms
- Nitocris patricia Chevrolat, 1858; Dirphya patricia (Chevrolat) Téocchi, 1999

Species of beetle

Leuconitocris patricia is a species of beetle in the family Cerambycidae. It was described by Chevrolat in 1858. It is known from Ivory Coast.
