= Leuconitocris lucasii =

Scientific classification
- Domain: Eukaryota
- Kingdom: Animalia
- Phylum: Arthropoda
- Class: Insecta
- Order: Coleoptera
- Suborder: Polyphaga
- Infraorder: Cucujiformia
- Family: Cerambycidae
- Genus: Leuconitocris
- Species: L. lucasii

Binomial name
- Leuconitocris lucasii (Thomson, 1858)

Synonyms
- Dirphya lucasii (Thomson, 1858); Nitocris lucasii Thomson, 1858

Species of beetle

Leuconitocris lucasii is a species of beetle in the family Cerambycidae. It was described by James Thomson in 1858. It is known from Gabon.
