= Leuconitocris aurigutticollis =

Scientific classification
- Domain: Eukaryota
- Kingdom: Animalia
- Phylum: Arthropoda
- Class: Insecta
- Order: Coleoptera
- Suborder: Polyphaga
- Infraorder: Cucujiformia
- Family: Cerambycidae
- Genus: Leuconitocris
- Species: L. aurigutticollis

Binomial name
- Leuconitocris aurigutticollis (Téocchi, 1998)

Synonyms
- Dirphya aurigutticollis (Téocchi, 1998); Nitakeris (Cicatronitocris) aurigutticollis (Téocchi) Téocchi, Sudre & Jiroux, 2010

Species of beetle

Leuconitocris aurigutticollis is a species of beetle in the family Cerambycidae. It was described by Pierre Téocchi in 1998.
