= Leuconitocris argyrostigma =

Scientific classification
- Domain: Eukaryota
- Kingdom: Animalia
- Phylum: Arthropoda
- Class: Insecta
- Order: Coleoptera
- Suborder: Polyphaga
- Infraorder: Cucujiformia
- Family: Cerambycidae
- Genus: Leuconitocris
- Species: L. argyrostigma

Binomial name
- Leuconitocris argyrostigma (Aurivillius, 1914)

Synonyms
- Nitakeris (Cicatronitocris) argyrostigma (Aurivillius) Téocchi, Sudre & Jiroux, 2010; Nitocris (Cicatronitocris) argyrostigma (Aurivillius) Breuning, 1950; Dirphya argyrostigma Aurivillius, 1914

Species of beetle

Leuconitocris argyrostigma is a species of beetle in the family Cerambycidae. It was described by Per Olof Christopher Aurivillius in 1914.

== Subspecies ==
- Leuconitocris argyrostigma argyrostigma Aurivillius, 1914
- Leuconitocris argyrostigma transvaalica (Breuning, 1961)
- Leuconitocris argyrostigma mozambica (Breuning, 1971)
