= Leuconitocris rufoantennalis =

Scientific classification
- Kingdom: Animalia
- Phylum: Arthropoda
- Class: Insecta
- Order: Coleoptera
- Suborder: Polyphaga
- Infraorder: Cucujiformia
- Family: Cerambycidae
- Genus: Leuconitocris
- Species: L. rufoantennalis

Binomial name
- Leuconitocris rufoantennalis (Breuning, 1950)

Synonyms
- Nitocris rufoantennalis Breuning, 1950; Dirphya rufoantennalis (Breuning, 1950)

Species of beetle

Leuconitocris rufoantennalis is a species of beetle in the family Cerambycidae. It was described by Stephan von Breuning in 1950, originally under the genus Nitocris.
