= Leuconitocris schultzei =

Scientific classification
- Domain: Eukaryota
- Kingdom: Animalia
- Phylum: Arthropoda
- Class: Insecta
- Order: Coleoptera
- Suborder: Polyphaga
- Infraorder: Cucujiformia
- Family: Cerambycidae
- Genus: Leuconitocris
- Species: L. schultzei

Binomial name
- Leuconitocris schultzei (Hintz, 1919)

Synonyms
- Dirphya schultzei (Hintz, 1919)

Species of beetle

Leuconitocris schultzei is a species of beetle in the family Cerambycidae. It was described by Hintz in 1919.
