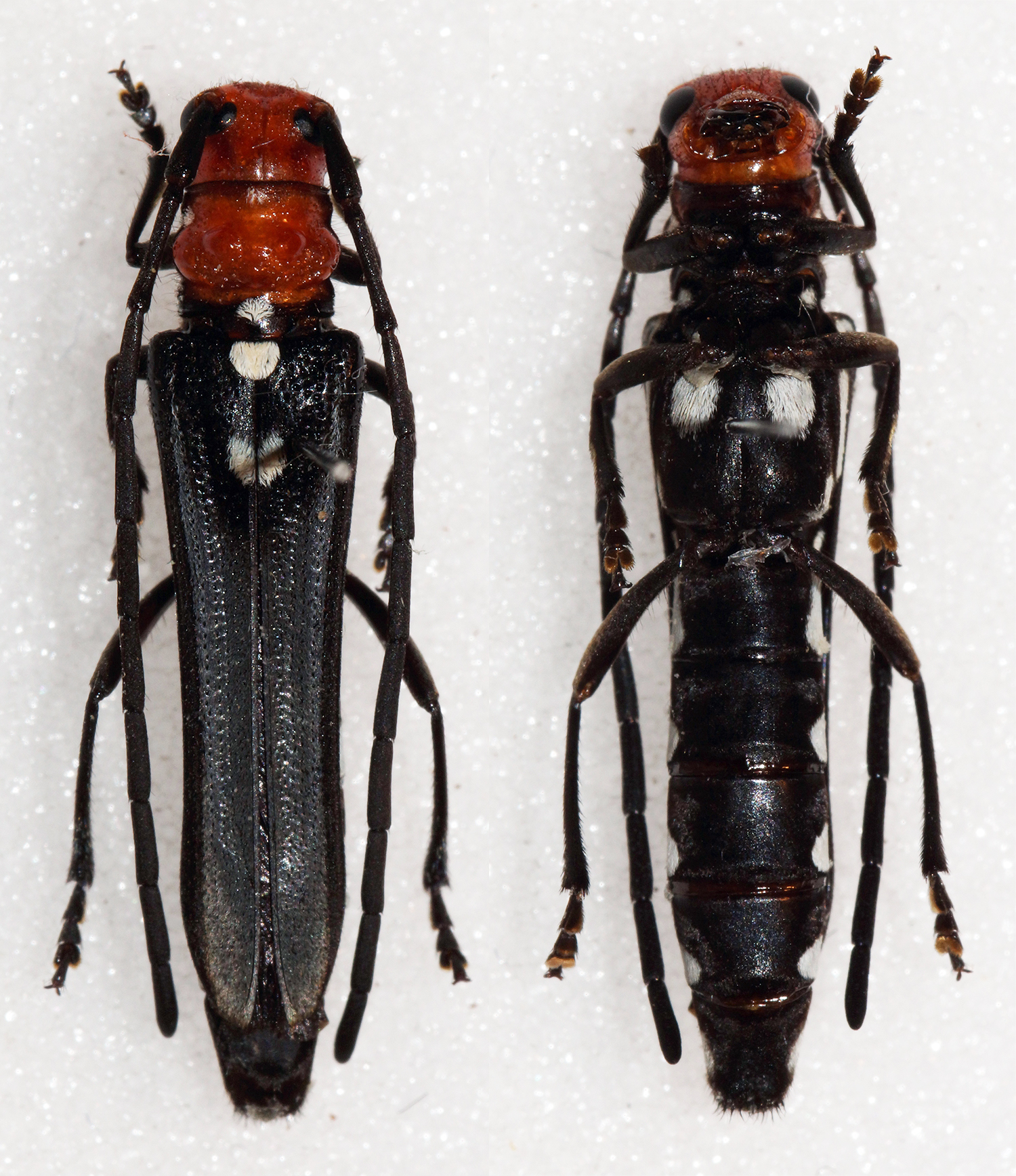
- Leuconitocris leucostigma

Scientific classification
- Kingdom: Animalia
- Phylum: Arthropoda
- Class: Insecta
- Order: Coleoptera
- Suborder: Polyphaga
- Infraorder: Cucujiformia
- Family: Cerambycidae
- Subfamily: Lamiinae
- Tribe: Saperdini
- Genus: Leuconitocris; Breuning, 1950

Species
- See text

= Leuconitocris =

Genus of beetles

Leuconitocris is a genus of longhorn beetles of the subfamily Lamiinae, containing the following species:

subgenus Cicatronitocris

- Leuconitocris argyrostigma (Aurivillius, 1914)
- Leuconitocris aurigutticollis (Téocchi, 1998)
- Leuconitocris delecta (Gahan, 1909)
- Leuconitocris kafakumbae (Breuning, 1950)
- Leuconitocris senegalensis (Audinet-Serville, 1835)
- Leuconitocris singularis (Téocchi, 1994)
- Leuconitocris tanganjyicae (Breuning, 1956)

subgenus Leuconitocris

- Leuconitocris chrysostigma (Harold, 1878)
- Leuconitocris leucostigma (Harold, 1878)

subgenus Nitakeris

- Leuconitocris acutipennis (Breuning, 1956)
- Leuconitocris adorata (Thomson, 1858)
- Leuconitocris angustifrons (Harold, 1878)
- Leuconitocris argenteovittata (Aurivillius, 1914)
- Leuconitocris atriceps (Breuning, 1956)
- Leuconitocris atricornis (Breuning, 1950)
- Leuconitocris basilewskyi (Breuning, 1955)
- Leuconitocris bicoloricornis (Breuning, 1965)
- Leuconitocris bifasciata (Aurivillius, 1927)
- Leuconitocris bimaculata (Franz, 1942)
- Leuconitocris buettneri (Kolbe, 1893)
- Leuconitocris calabarica (Breuning, 1956)
- Leuconitocris dimidiaticornis (Chevrolat, 1857)
- Leuconitocris flavipennis (Breuning, 1956)
- Leuconitocris flavotibialis (Breuning, 1956)
- Leuconitocris fuscofasciata (Breuning & Téocchi, 1978)
- Leuconitocris fuscosternalis (Breuning, 1950)
- Leuconitocris gigantea (Nonfried, 1892)
- Leuconitocris gracilior (Breuning, 1956)
- Leuconitocris guineensis (Breuning, 1956)
- Leuconitocris hintzi (Aurivillius, 1923)
- Leuconitocris imitans (Breuning, 1956)
- Leuconitocris juvenca (Brancsik, 1914)
- Leuconitocris lualabae (Aurivillius, 1914)
- Leuconitocris lucasii (Thomson, 1858)
- Leuconitocris major (Breuning, 1956)
- Leuconitocris microphthalma (Breuning, 1950)
- Leuconitocris minor (Breuning, 1956)
- Leuconitocris murphyi (Sudre & Téocchi, 2005)
- Leuconitocris nigriceps (Aurivillius, 1914)
- Leuconitocris nigricollis (Aurivillius, 1914)
- Leuconitocris nigricornis (Olivier, 1795)
- Leuconitocris nigrofasciata (Aurivillius, 1925)
- Leuconitocris obereoides (Breuning, 1956)
- Leuconitocris occidentalis (Breuning, 1956)
- Leuconitocris parahintzi (Breuning & Téocchi, 1978)
- Leuconitocris pascoei (Thomson, 1858)
- Leuconitocris patricia (Chevrolat, 1858)
- Leuconitocris plagiata (Aurivillius, 1914)
- Leuconitocris pseudolucasi (Breuning, 1956)
- Leuconitocris pseudonigriceps (Breuning, 1950)
- Leuconitocris pseudoschultzei (Breuning, 1950)
- Leuconitocris rufoantennalis (Breuning, 1950)
- Leuconitocris rufomedioantennalis (Breuning, 1964)
- Leuconitocris sanguinicollis (Breuning, 1956)
- Leuconitocris schoutedeni (Breuning, 1951)
- Leuconitocris schultzei (Hintz, 1919)
- Leuconitocris sessensis (Breuning, 1956)
- Leuconitocris similis (Gahan, 1894)
- Leuconitocris simpsoni (Aurivillius, 1914)
- Leuconitocris subjuvenca (Breuning, 1950)
- Leuconitocris tibialis (Kolbe, 1893)
- Leuconitocris togoensis (Breuning, 1961)
- Leuconitocris uniformis (Breuning, 1950)
