= Leuconitocris tibialis =

Scientific classification
- Domain: Eukaryota
- Kingdom: Animalia
- Phylum: Arthropoda
- Class: Insecta
- Order: Coleoptera
- Suborder: Polyphaga
- Infraorder: Cucujiformia
- Family: Cerambycidae
- Genus: Leuconitocris
- Species: L. tibialis

Binomial name
- Leuconitocris tibialis (Kolbe, 1893)

Synonyms
- Dirphya tibialis (Kolbe, 1893); Dirphya fulva (Breuning, 1950); Nitakeris suturalis (Jordan, 1894); Nitocris suturalis Jordan, 1894; Nitocris tibialis Kolbe, 1893; Nitocris fulva fulva (Breuning, 1950); Nitocris fulva angolana Breuning, 1978; Nitocris major var. flaveola Breuning, 1962; Oberea suturalis (Jordan, 1894)

Species of beetle

Leuconitocris tibialis is a species of beetle in the family Cerambycidae. It was described by Kolbe in 1893, originally under the genus Nitocris. It contains the varietas Leuconitocris tibialis var. holoflava.
