= Leuconitocris buettneri =

Scientific classification
- Domain: Eukaryota
- Kingdom: Animalia
- Phylum: Arthropoda
- Class: Insecta
- Order: Coleoptera
- Suborder: Polyphaga
- Infraorder: Cucujiformia
- Family: Cerambycidae
- Genus: Leuconitocris
- Species: L. buettneri

Binomial name
- Leuconitocris buettneri (Kolbe, 1893)

Synonyms
- Nitocris buettneri Kolbe, 1893; Dirphya buettneri (Kolbe, 1893)

Species of beetle

Leuconitocris buettneri is a species of beetle in the family Cerambycidae. It was described by Hermann Julius Kolbe in 1893.

== Subspecies ==
- Leuconitocris buettneri buettneri (Kolbe, 1893)
- Leuconitocris buettneri seminigrofemoralis (Breuning, 1951)
