= Leuconitocris pseudolucasi =

Scientific classification
- Kingdom: Animalia
- Phylum: Arthropoda
- Class: Insecta
- Order: Coleoptera
- Suborder: Polyphaga
- Infraorder: Cucujiformia
- Family: Cerambycidae
- Genus: Leuconitocris
- Species: L. pseudolucasi

Binomial name
- Leuconitocris pseudolucasi (Breuning, 1956)

Synonyms
- Dirphya pseudolucasi m. murzini Téocchi, Jiroux & Sudre, 2004; Dirphya pseudolucasi Breuning, 1956

Species of beetle

Leuconitocris pseudolucasi is a species of beetle in the family Cerambycidae. It was described by Stephan von Breuning in 1956.
