= Leuconitocris occidentalis =

Scientific classification
- Kingdom: Animalia
- Phylum: Arthropoda
- Class: Insecta
- Order: Coleoptera
- Suborder: Polyphaga
- Infraorder: Cucujiformia
- Family: Cerambycidae
- Genus: Leuconitocris
- Species: L. occidentalis

Binomial name
- Leuconitocris occidentalis (Breuning, 1956)

Synonyms
- Dirphya occidentalis (Breuning, 1956)

Species of beetle

Leuconitocris occidentalis is a species of beetle in the family Cerambycidae. It was described by Stephan von Breuning in 1956.
