= Leuconitocris chrysostigma =

Scientific classification
- Domain: Eukaryota
- Kingdom: Animalia
- Phylum: Arthropoda
- Class: Insecta
- Order: Coleoptera
- Suborder: Polyphaga
- Infraorder: Cucujiformia
- Family: Cerambycidae
- Genus: Leuconitocris
- Species: L. chrysostigma

Binomial name
- Leuconitocris chrysostigma (Harold, 1878)

Synonyms
- Nitakeris (Leuconitocris) chrysostigma (Harold) Téocchi, Sudre & Jiroux, 2010; Dirphya (Leuconitocris) chrysostigma (Harold) Breuning, 1950; Nitocris peplus Jordan, 1903; Nitocris chrysostigma Harold, 1878

Species of beetle

Leuconitocris chrysostigma is a species of beetle in the family Cerambycidae. It was described by Harold in 1878, originally under the genus Nitocris. It contains the varietas Leuconitocris chrysostigma var. rufiniventris.
