= Leuconitocris dimidiaticornis =

Scientific classification
- Domain: Eukaryota
- Kingdom: Animalia
- Phylum: Arthropoda
- Class: Insecta
- Order: Coleoptera
- Suborder: Polyphaga
- Infraorder: Cucujiformia
- Family: Cerambycidae
- Genus: Leuconitocris
- Species: L. dimidiaticornis

Binomial name
- Leuconitocris dimidiaticornis (Chevrolat, 1857)

Synonyms
- Dirphya dimidiaticornis (Chevrolat, 1857)

Species of beetle

Leuconitocris dimidiaticornis is a species of beetle in the family Cerambycidae. It was described by Louis Alexandre Auguste Chevrolat in 1857.

== Subspecies ==
- Dirphya dimidiaticornis dimidiaticornis (Chevrolat, 1857)
- Dirphya dimidiaticornis obliquesignata (Breuning, 1950)
