= Leuconitocris hintzi =

Scientific classification
- Kingdom: Animalia
- Phylum: Arthropoda
- Clade: Pancrustacea
- Class: Insecta
- Order: Coleoptera
- Suborder: Polyphaga
- Infraorder: Cucujiformia
- Family: Cerambycidae
- Genus: Leuconitocris
- Species: L. hintzi

Binomial name
- Leuconitocris hintzi (Aurivillius, 1923)

Synonyms
- Nitocris hintzi Aurivillius, 1923; Nitocris nigriceps Hintz, 1916 nec Aurivillius, 1914; Dirphya hintzi (Aurivillius, 1923)

Species of beetle

Leuconitocris hintzi is a species of beetle in the family Cerambycidae. It was described by Per Olof Christopher Aurivillius in 1923, originally under the genus Nitocris.

== Subspecies ==
- Dirphya hintzi hintzi (Aurivillius, 1923)
- Dirphya hintzi ituriensis Breuning, 1972
