= Leuconitocris juvenca =

Scientific classification
- Domain: Eukaryota
- Kingdom: Animalia
- Phylum: Arthropoda
- Class: Insecta
- Order: Coleoptera
- Suborder: Polyphaga
- Infraorder: Cucujiformia
- Family: Cerambycidae
- Genus: Leuconitocris
- Species: L. juvenca

Binomial name
- Leuconitocris juvenca (Brancsik, 1914)

Synonyms
- Nitocris juvenca Brancsik, 1914

Species of beetle

Leuconitocris juvenca is a species of beetle in the family Cerambycidae. It was described by Brancsik in 1914. It is known from Tanzania, South Africa, the Democratic Republic of the Congo, Mozambique, Zimbabwe, and Zambia.

== Subspecies ==
- Leuconitocris juvenca capinera (Teocchi, 1989)
- Leuconitocris juvenca juvenca (Brancsik, 1914)
