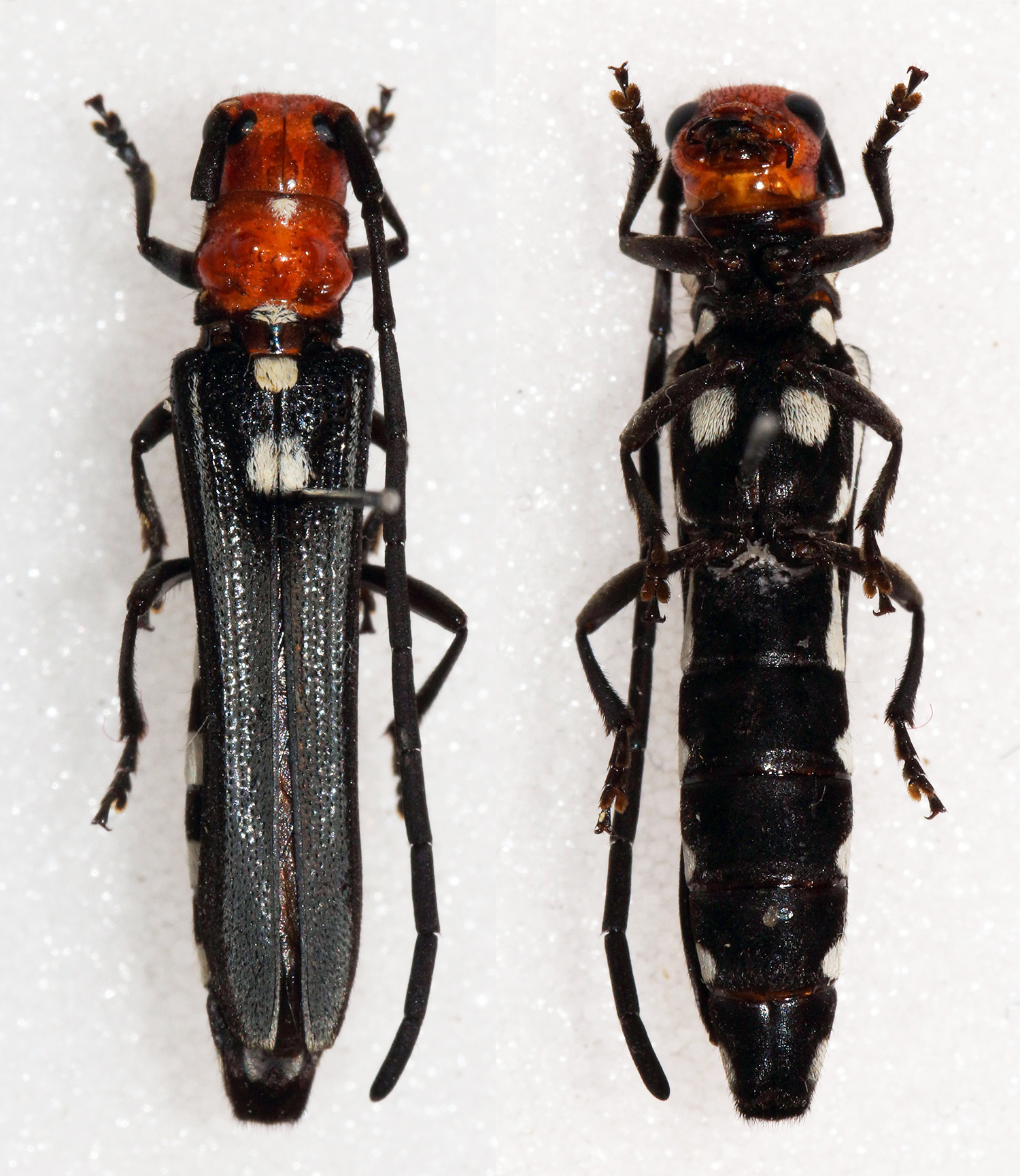

Scientific classification
- Domain: Eukaryota
- Kingdom: Animalia
- Phylum: Arthropoda
- Class: Insecta
- Order: Coleoptera
- Suborder: Polyphaga
- Infraorder: Cucujiformia
- Family: Cerambycidae
- Genus: Leuconitocris
- Species: L. leucostigma

Binomial name
- Leuconitocris leucostigma (Harold, 1878)

Synonyms
- Dirphya (Leuconitocris) leucostigma m. alboreducta Téocchi, 1998; Dirphya (Leuconitocris) leucostigma (Harold) Breuning, 1950; Nitocris leucostigma Harold, 1878; Nitakeris (Leuconitocris) leucostigma (Harold) Téocchi, Sudre & Jiroux, 2010

= Leuconitocris leucostigma =

Species of beetle

Leuconitocris leucostigma is a species of beetle in the family Cerambycidae. It was described by Harold in 1878. It has a wide distribution in Africa.

== Varietas ==
- Leuconitocris leucostigma var. albosignata (Breuning, 1950)
- Leuconitocris leucostigma var. ochrescens (Breuning, 1956)
