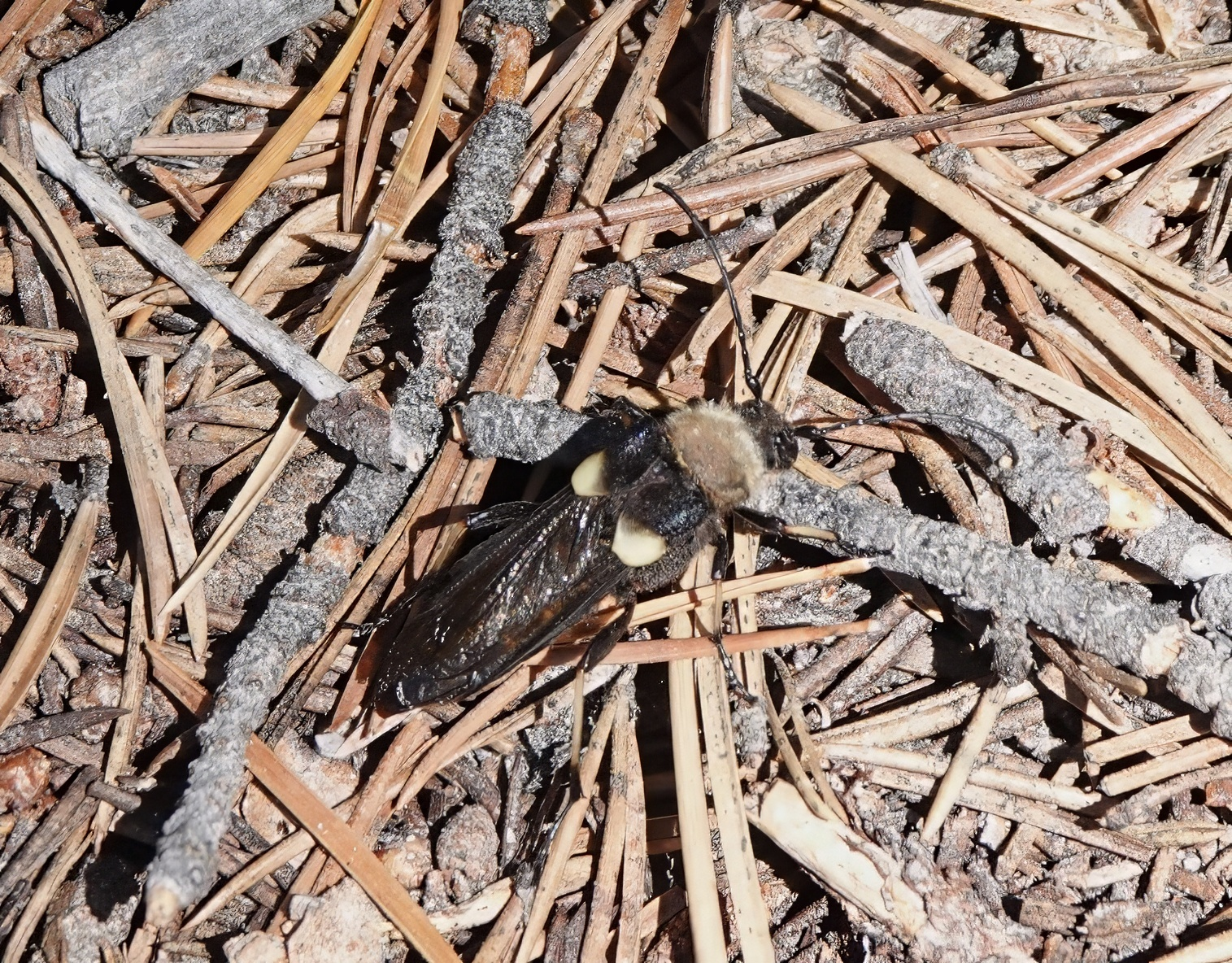
- Ulochaetes leoninus, California

Scientific classification
- Kingdom: Animalia
- Phylum: Arthropoda
- Class: Insecta
- Order: Coleoptera
- Suborder: Polyphaga
- Infraorder: Cucujiformia
- Family: Cerambycidae
- Subfamily: Necydalinae
- Genus: Ulochaetes; LeConte, 1854

= Ulochaetes =

Genus of beetles

Ulochaetes is a genus in the longhorn beetle family Cerambycidae. There are at least two described species in Ulochaetes.

== Species ==
These two species belong to the genus Ulochaetes:

- Ulochaetes leoninus LeConte, 1854 (North America)
- Ulochaetes vacca Holzschuh, 1982 (Bhutan and China)
