= Leuconitocris rufomedioantennalis =

Scientific classification
- Kingdom: Animalia
- Phylum: Arthropoda
- Class: Insecta
- Order: Coleoptera
- Suborder: Polyphaga
- Infraorder: Cucujiformia
- Family: Cerambycidae
- Genus: Leuconitocris
- Species: L. rufomedioantennalis

Binomial name
- Leuconitocris rufomedioantennalis (Breuning, 1964)

Synonyms
- Dirphya rufomedioantennalis (Breuning, 1964)

Species of beetle

Leuconitocris rufomedioantennalis is a species of beetle in the family Cerambycidae. It was described by Stephan von Breuning in 1964.
