= Necydalis barbarae =

Scientific classification
- Domain: Eukaryota
- Kingdom: Animalia
- Phylum: Arthropoda
- Class: Insecta
- Order: Coleoptera
- Suborder: Polyphaga
- Infraorder: Cucujiformia
- Family: Cerambycidae
- Genus: Necydalis
- Species: N. barbarae

Binomial name
- Necydalis barbarae Rivers, 1890

Species of beetle

Necydalis barbarae is a species of long-horned beetle in the family Cerambycidae. It is found in North America.
