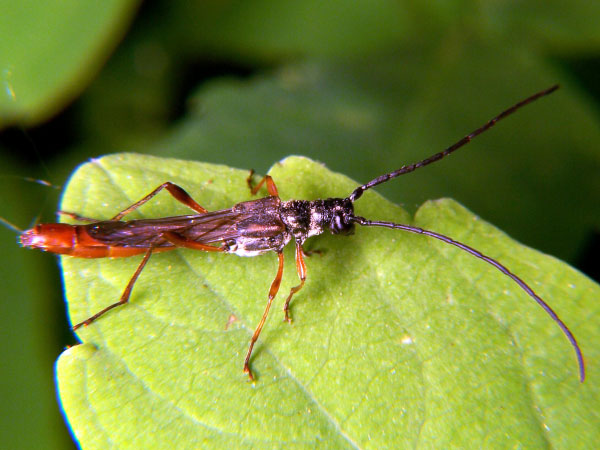

Scientific classification
- Domain: Eukaryota
- Kingdom: Animalia
- Phylum: Arthropoda
- Class: Insecta
- Order: Coleoptera
- Suborder: Polyphaga
- Infraorder: Cucujiformia
- Family: Cerambycidae
- Genus: Necydalis
- Species: N. mellita

Binomial name
- Necydalis mellita Chevrolat, 1838

= Necydalis mellita =

Species of beetle

Necydalis mellita is a longhorn beetle in the family Cerambycidae.

The very long and slender body, colouration, the short elytra, exposing the wings and the constricted pronotum of beetles in this genus are an instance of Batesian mimicry.

== Description ==
This beetle is around 2 cm (0.8 in) long. The antenna are longer than the body, and with its black and red colouring, elongate body and short elytra, it resembles a wasp.
