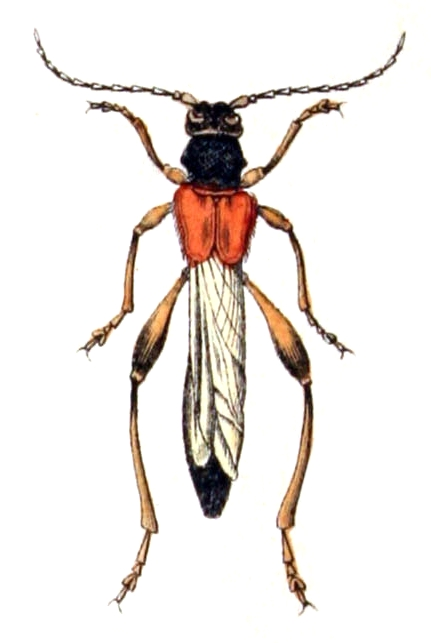
- Necydalis major

Scientific classification
- Domain: Eukaryota
- Kingdom: Animalia
- Phylum: Arthropoda
- Class: Insecta
- Order: Coleoptera
- Suborder: Polyphaga
- Infraorder: Cucujiformia
- Family: Cerambycidae
- Subfamily: Necydalinae
- Tribe: Necydalini
- Genus: Necydalis; Linnaeus, 1758

Synonyms
- Necydalus (Linnaeus) Gistel, 1856 (misspelling); Gymnopterion Schrank, 1798

= Necydalis =

Genus of beetles

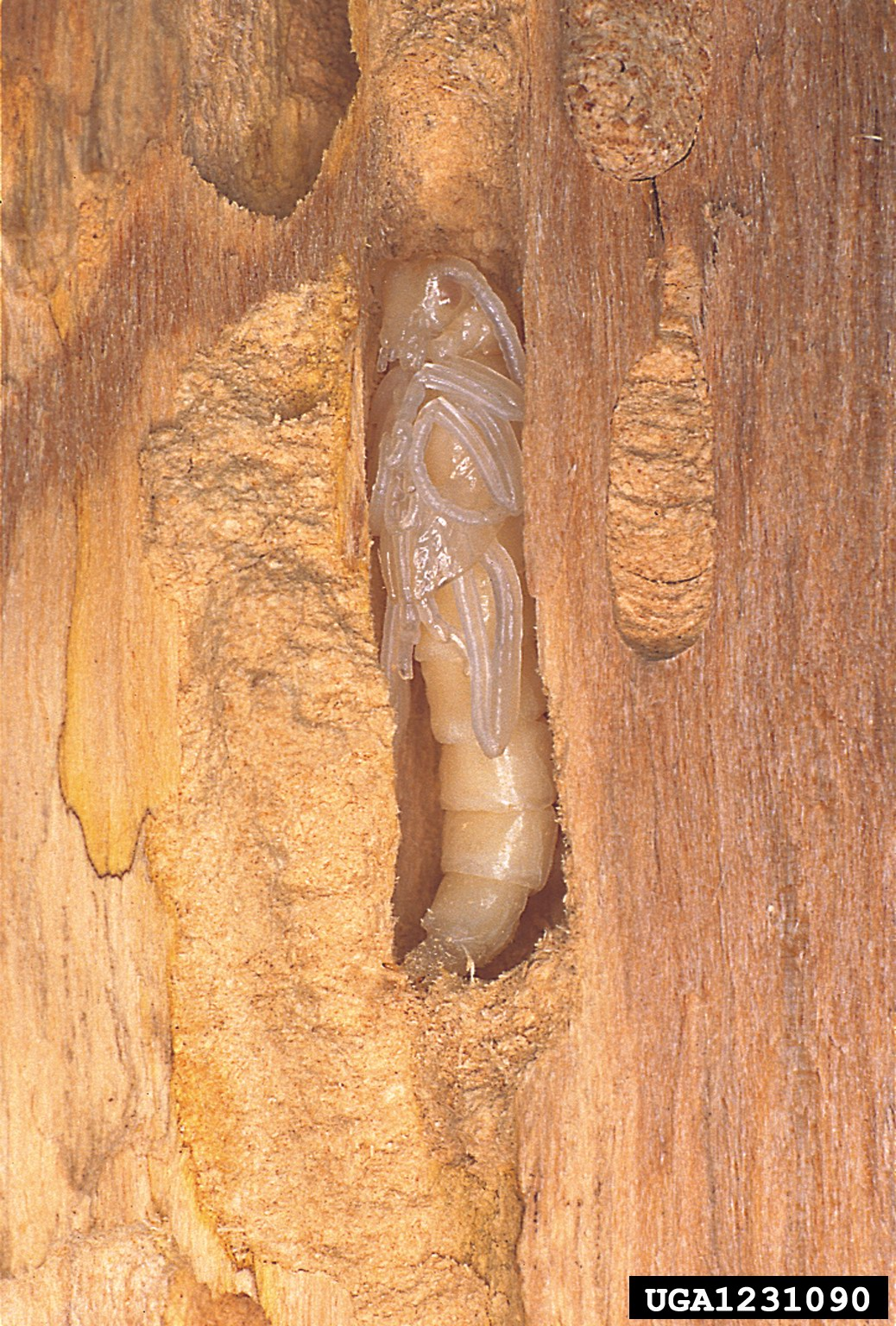
Necydalis major pupa

Necydalis is a genus of beetles in the family Cerambycidae: that appears to be mostly distributed in the Oriental and Palaearctic realms.

== Species ==
BioLib includes:

subgenus Calonecydalis Takakuwa, 1992

1. Necydalis itoi Takakuwa, 1992
2. Necydalis malayana Hayashi, 1979

subgenus Eonecydalis Ohbayashi, 1961

1. Necydalis bicolor Pu, 1992
2. Necydalis formosana Kano, 1933

subgenus Necydalis Linnaeus, 1758

1. Necydalis acutipennis Van Dyke, 1923
2. Necydalis alpinicola Niisato & Ohbayashi N., 2003
3. Necydalis annectans Holzschuh, 2009
4. Necydalis araii Niisato, 1998
5. Necydalis atricornis Niisato & Ohbayashi N., 2004
6. Necydalis barbarae Rivers, 1890
7. Necydalis cavipennis LeConte, 1873
8. Necydalis choui Niisato, 2004
9. Necydalis christinae Rapuzzi & Sama, 2014
10. Necydalis collaris Forster, 1771
11. Necydalis diversicollis Schaeffer, 1932
12. Necydalis esakii Miwa & Mitono, 1937
13. Necydalis fujianensis Niisato & Pu, 1998
14. Necydalis gigantea Kano, 1933
15. Necydalis hirayamai Ohbayashi, 1948
16. Necydalis ignotus Holzschuh, 2009
17. Necydalis indica Pic, 1912
18. Necydalis inermis Pu, 1992
19. Necydalis insulicola Fisher, 1936
20. Necydalis katsuraorum Niisato, 1998
21. Necydalis kumei Takakuwa, 1997
22. Necydalis laevicollis LeConte, 1869
23. Necydalis maculipennis Pu, 1992
24. Necydalis major Linnaeus, 1758 - type species
25. Necydalis marginipennis Gressitt, 1948
26. Necydalis mellita (Say, 1835)
27. Necydalis mizunumai Kusama, 1974
28. Necydalis montipanus Niisato & N. Ohbayashi, 2004
29. Necydalis moriyai Kusama, 1970
30. Necydalis nanshanensis Kusama, 1975
31. Necydalis niisatoi Holzschuh, 2003
32. Necydalis rudei Linsley & Chemsak, 1972
33. Necydalis rufiabdominis Chen,
34. Necydalis sabatinellii Sama, 1994
35. Necydalis sericella Ganglbauer, 1889
36. Necydalis shinborii Takakuwa & Niisato, 1996
37. Necydalis sirexoides Reitter, 1902
38. Necydalis spissicus Holzschuh, 2009
39. Necydalis strnadi Holzschuh, 1989
40. Necydalis uenoi Niisato, 2004
41. Necydalis ulmi Chevrolat, 1838
42. Necydalis wakaharai Niisato & N. Ohbayashi, 2004
43. Necydalis yakushimensis Kusama, 1975

subgenus Necydalisca Plavilstshikov, 1936

1. Necydalis concolor Niisato & Ohbayashi, 2004
2. Necydalis harmandi Pic, 1902
3. Necydalis indicola Gardner, 1941
4. Necydalis kukerai Niisato, 2007
5. Necydalis lateralis Pic, 1939
6. Necydalis nepalens Niisato & Weigel, 2006
7. Necydalis odai Hayashi, 1951
8. Necydalis pennata Lewis, 1879
9. Necydalis sachalinensis Matsushita & Tamanuki, 1927
10. Necydalis solida Bates, 1884
11. †Necydalis zangi Vitali, 2011
